= List of awards and nominations received by Metallica =

Metallica awards and nominations
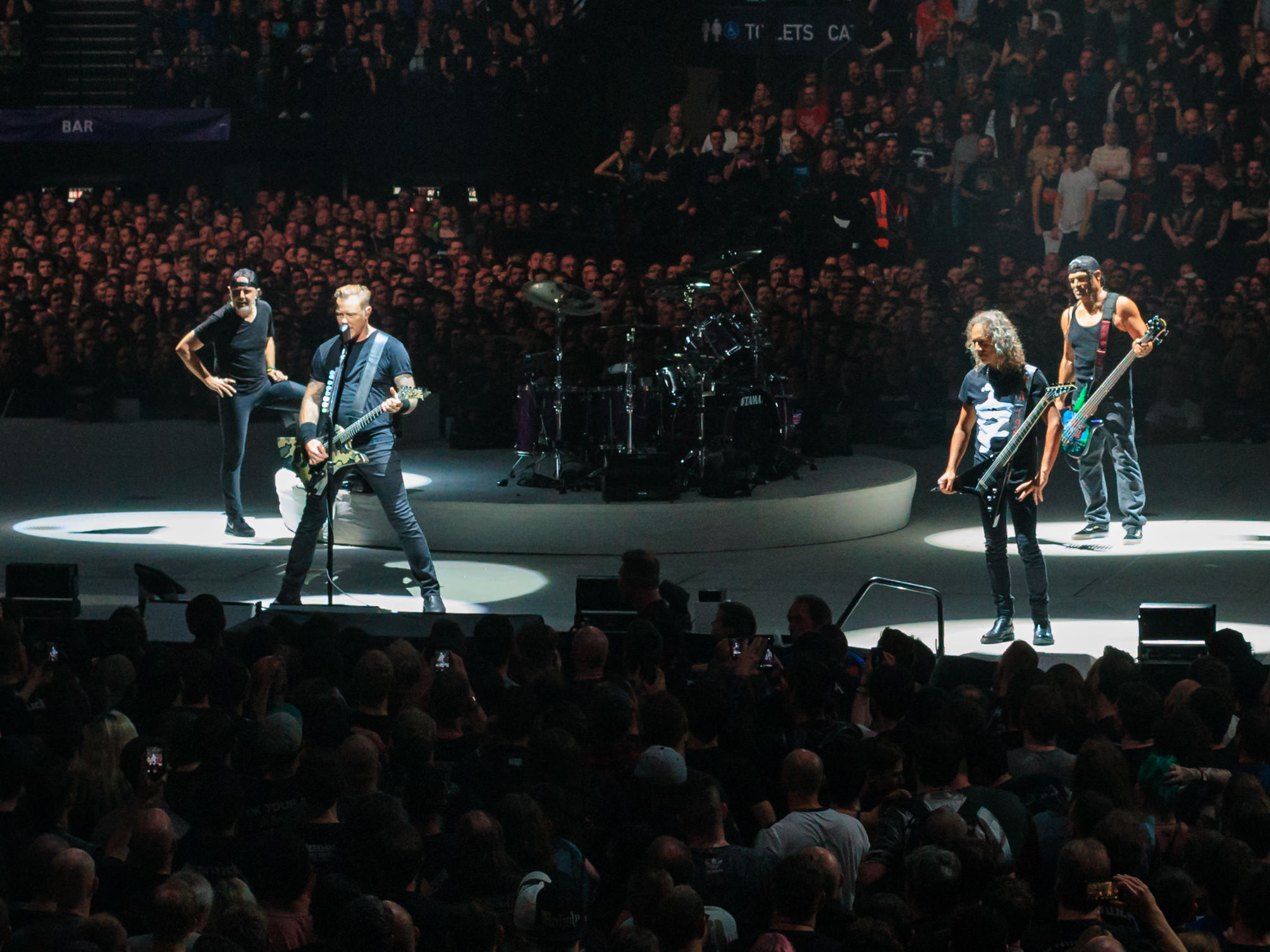
- Metallica in London, England in 2017. From left to right: Lars Ulrich, James Hetfield, Kirk Hammett and Robert Trujillo.
Awards and nominations
| Award | Wins | Nominations |
| American Music Awards | 2 | 7 |
| Billboard | 5 | 10 |
| Grammy | 9 | 26 |
| Juno | 0 | 3 |
| Kerrang! | 7 | 10 |
| Meteor Music | 0 | 1 |
| MTV Europe | 0 | 7 |
| MTV VMA | 2 | 14 |
| Radio Music | 0 | 2 |
| Q | 0 | 1 |
| World Music | 0 | 1 |
| Rock on Request Awards | 2 | 2 |

Totals (Note: Certain award groups do not simply award one winner. They acknowledge several different recipients, have runners-up, and have third place. Since this is a specific recognition and is different from losing an award, runner-up mentions are considered wins in this award tally. For simplification and to avoid errors, each award in this list has been presumed to have had a prior nomination.)
- Wins: 104
- Nominations: 187

Metallica is an American Grammy Award-winning heavy metal band formed in 1981 from Los Angeles, California. Metallica consists of lead vocalist, rhythm guitarist and main songwriter James Hetfield who is also co-founder of the band along with the drummer Lars Ulrich, while Kirk Hammett is lead guitarist and Robert Trujillo is bassist. Before this lineup Metallica consisted of Ron McGovney as the original bassist from 1981 until he left the band in 1982 and then Cliff Burton joined the band as a bassist in 1982 and played until his death in 1986. After his death, Jason Newsted worked as a bassist from 1986 until his departure from Metallica in 2001 and he was replaced by Robert Trujillo in 2003. The other American heavy metal band Megadeth's front man Dave Mustaine, actually was the first lead guitarist and a co-songwriter of Metallica until he was fired from the band in 1983 and was replaced by present lead guitarist Kirk Hammett.

The band has released eleven studio albums: Kill 'Em All (1983), Ride the Lightning (1984), Master of Puppets (1986), ...And Justice for All (1988), Metallica (1991), Load (1996), ReLoad (1997), St. Anger (2003), Death Magnetic (2008), Hardwired... to Self-Destruct (2016), and 72 Seasons (2023). All of the albums were released by the now-dormant Elektra Records, except for Death Magnetic (2008), released by Warner Bros. Records and for 72 Seasons, released by their very own record company Blackened Recordings. One of the most commercially successful heavy metal bands, Metallica has sold over 66 million albums in the United States.

Metallica has received nine Grammy Awards; seven were for Best Metal Performance in 1990, 1991, 1992, 1999, 2004, 2009 and 2024. The song "Enter Sandman" has been particularly successful for the band; it was nominated for Best Rock Song at the Grammy Awards, and it won Best Metal Video at the MTV Video Music Awards in 1992. The group also won Best Rock Video in 1996 for "Until it Sleeps". Metallica has been nominated four times for Favorite Heavy Metal/Hard Rock Artist at the American Music Awards, winning it in 1993 and 1997. They have also received ten nominations from the Billboard Music Awards, winning all five. The band has also been nominated for three Juno Awards. Overall, Metallica has received 104 awards from 187 nominations.

== American Music Awards ==
The American Music Awards is an annual awards ceremony created by Dick Clark in 1973. Metallica has received two awards out of seven nominations.

| Year | Nominee / work | Award | Result |
|---|---|---|---|
| 1992 | Metallica (The Black Album) | Favorite Heavy Metal/Hard Rock Album | Nominated |
| 1992 | Metallica | Favorite Heavy Metal/Hard Rock Artist | Nominated |
| 1993 | Metallica | Favorite Heavy Metal/Hard Rock Artist | Won |
| 1994 | Metallica | Favorite Heavy Metal/Hard Rock Artist | Nominated |
| 1997 | Metallica | Favorite Heavy Metal/Hard Rock Artist | Won |
| 1999 | Metallica | Favorite Concert Artist | Nominated |
| 2003 (November) | Metallica | Favorite Alternative Artist | Nominated |

== ARTISTdirect Online Music Awards ==
| Year | Nominee / work | Award | Result |
|---|---|---|---|
| 2000 | S&M | Favorite Turn-It-Up-Loud CD | Won |
| 2000 | Metallica | Most Talked About Artist | Won |
| 2000 | Metallica | Favorite Group | Won |
| 2000 | Metallica | Best Fan Website | Won |
| 2000 | Metallica | Best Official Website | Won |

== ASCAP Pop Music Awards ==
The ASCAP Pop Music Awards is an annual awards ceremony sponsored by The American Society of Composers, Authors, and Publishers.

| Year | Nominee / work | Award | Result |
|---|---|---|---|
| 2004 | Metallica | Creative Voice Award | Won |

== Bandit Rock Awards ==
The Bandit Rock Awards are an annual ceremony held by the Swedish radio station of the same name.

| Year | Nominee / work | Award | Result |
|---|---|---|---|
| 2018 | Metallica | Best International Group | Won |

== Billboard Music Awards ==
The Billboard Music Awards is sponsored by Billboard magazine and held annually in December. Metallica has received five awards.

| Year | Nominee / work | Award | Result |
|---|---|---|---|
| 1988 | Cliff 'Em All | Top Music Videocassette of the Year | Won |
| 1997 | Metallica | Rock and Roll Artist of the Year | Won |
| 1999 | Metallica (The Black Album) | Catalogue Album of the Year | Won |
| 1999 | Metallica | Catalogue Artist of the Year | Won |
| 2017 | Metallica | Top Rock Artist | Nominated |
| 2017 | Hardwired... to Self-Destruct | Top Rock Album | Won |
| 2020 | Metallica | Top Touring | Nominated |
| 2020 | Metallica | Top Rock Tour | Nominated |
| 2023 | Metallica | Top Duo/Group | Nominated |
| 2023 | Metallica | Top Rock Duo/Group | Nominated |

== Billboard Touring Awards ==
The Billboard Touring Awards is an annual meeting sponsored by Billboard magazine which also honors the top international live entertainment industry artists and professionals.

| Year | Nominee / work | Award | Result |
|---|---|---|---|
| 2010 | Metallica | Eventful Fans' Choice | Won |

== California Music Awards ==
Beginning in 1978 and continuing until the magazine ceased publication in 1999, BAM magazine presented the Bay Area Music Awards, also known as the Bammies, in an annual awards ceremony honoring accomplishments of the Bay Area music community. The awards ceremony continued for a couple more years with its name changed to the California Music Awards and absent its prior focus on the music of the Bay Area.

| Year | Nominee / work | Award | Result |
|---|---|---|---|
| 1989 | ...And Justice for All | Outstanding Album | Won |
| 1990 | Metallica | Outstanding Group | Won |
| 1992 | Metallica | Outstanding Album | Won |
| 1992 | Metallica | Outstanding Heavy Metal Album | Won |
| 1992 | "Enter Sandman" | Outstanding Song | Won |
| 1993 | Metallica | Outstanding Group | Won |
| 1997 | Metallica | Outstanding Group | Won |
| 1999 | ReLoad | Outstanding Hard Rock Album | Won |
| 2000 | S&M | Arthur M. Sohcot Award for Excellence | Won |
| 2004 | Kirk Hammett | Outstanding Guitarist | Won |

== Classic Rock Awards ==
The Classic Rock Roll Of Honour is an annual awards program established in 2005 by Classic Rock magazine. Winners of the awards are chosen by the awards team and voted on by readers of the magazine. Winners are announced at an annual awards show and featured in the magazine.

| Year | Nominee / work | Award | Result |
|---|---|---|---|
| 2008 | KEA, RTL and MOP | Best Reissue | Won |
| 2014 | Metallica: Through the Never | Film Of The Year | Won |

== Echo Music Prize ==
Echo Music Prize (stylised as ECHO) is an accolade by the Deutsche Phono-Akademie an association of recording companies of Germany to recognize outstanding achievement in the music industry.

| Year | Nominee / work | Award | Result |
|---|---|---|---|
| 2017 | Metallica – Hardwired... to Self-Destruct | International Band | Won |

== Emma Gaala ==
Emma Gaala is a Finnish music gala arranged yearly by Musiikkituottajat – IFPI Finland, awarding the Emma Muuvi or Emma Awards to the most distinguished artists and music professionals of the year. It has been arranged annually since 1983.

| Year | Nominee / work | Award | Result |
|---|---|---|---|
| 2009 | Death Magnetic | Top-Selling Album Of The Year | Won |

== ESPN Action Sports & Music Awards ==
In April 2001, ESPN held its Action Sports and Music Awards ceremony where "celebrities in the fields of extreme sports and popular music" were honored.

| Year | Nominee / work | Award | Result |
|---|---|---|---|
| 2001 | Metallica | Artist Contribution | Won |

== GAFFA Awards ==
=== Denmark GAFFA Awards ===
Delivered since 1991, the GAFFA Awards are a Danish award that rewards popular music by the magazine of the same name. Metallica has received one award out of seventeen nominations.

| Year | Nominee / work | Award | Result | Ref. |
|---|---|---|---|---|
| 1991 | Metallica | Band | Nominated | |
| 1991 | Metallica | Album of the Year | Nominated | |
| 1991 | "Enter Sandman" | Song of the Year | Nominated | |
| 1991 | "Enter Sandman" | Music Video of the Year | Nominated | |
| 1992 | Metallica | Concert of the Year | Nominated | |
| 1992 | Metallica | Band | Nominated | |
| 1993 | Metallica | Band | Nominated | |
| 1993 | Metallica | Concert of the Year | Nominated | |
| 1996 | Metallica | Foreign Live Act | Nominated | |
| 1996 | Load | Foreign Album | Nominated | |
| 1997 | Metallica | Foreign Band | Nominated | |
| 1997 | Metallica | Foreign Live Act | Nominated | |
| 1997 | "The Memory Remains" | Foreign Song | Nominated | |
| 1997 | Reload | Foreign Album | Nominated | |
| 1999 | Metallica | Foreign Live Name | Nominated | |
| 2003 | Metallica | Foreign Live Name | Nominated | |
| 2016 | Metallica | Best Foreign Band | Won | |

== Grammy Awards ==
The Grammy Awards are awarded annually by the National Academy of Recording Arts and Sciences. Metallica has received 9 awards out of 26 nominations.

| Year | Nominee / work | Award | Result |
|---|---|---|---|
| 1989 | ...And Justice for All | Best Hard Rock/Metal Performance Vocal or Instrumental | Nominated |
| 1990 | "One" | Best Metal Performance | Won |
| 1991 | "Stone Cold Crazy" | Best Metal Performance | Won |
| 1992 | Metallica (The Black Album) | Best Metal Performance | Won |
| 1992 | "Enter Sandman" | Best Rock Song | Nominated |
| 1996 | "For Whom the Bell Tolls" | Best Metal Performance | Nominated |
| 1999 | "Better than You" | Best Metal Performance | Won |
| 1999 | "Fuel" | Best Hard Rock Performance | Nominated |
| 2000 | "Whiskey in the Jar" | Best Hard Rock Performance | Won |
| 2001 | "The Call of Ktulu" | Best Rock Instrumental Performance | Won |
| 2004 | "St. Anger" | Best Metal Performance | Won |
| 2005 | "Some Kind of Monster" | Best Hard Rock Performance | Nominated |
| 2008 | "The Ecstasy of Gold" | Best Rock Instrumental Performance | Nominated |
| 2009 | Death Magnetic | Best Rock Album | Nominated |
| 2009 | "My Apocalypse" | Best Metal Performance | Won |
| 2009 | "Suicide & Redemption" | Best Rock Instrumental Performance | Nominated |
| 2010 | "The Unforgiven III" | Best Hard Rock Performance | Nominated |
| 2014 | Through The Never | Best Recording Package | Nominated^{[I]} |
| 2015 | Metallica Through the Never | Best Music Film | Nominated |
| 2017 | "Hardwired" | Best Rock Song | Nominated |
| 2018 | Hardwired... to Self-Destruct | Best Rock Album | Nominated |
| 2018 | "Atlas, Rise!" | Best Rock Song | Nominated |
| 2024 | 72 Seasons | Best Rock Album | Nominated |
| 2024 | "Lux Æterna" | Best Rock Performance | Nominated |
| 2024 | "72 Seasons" | Best Metal Performance | Won |
| 2025 | "Screaming Suicide" | Best Metal Performance | Nominated |

== Heavy Music Awards ==
| Year | Nominee / work | Award | Result |
|---|---|---|---|
| 2018 | Metallica | Best International Band | Won |

== Hungarian Music Awards ==
The Hungarian Music Awards have been given to artists in the field of Hungarian music since 1992. The awards were known as the Golden Giraffe Awards until 2003. The award is presented by Mahasz, the Hungarian music industry association. The current official name is Fonogram – Hungarian Music Awards.

| Year | Nominee / work | Award | Result |
|---|---|---|---|
| 1997 | Load | Rock Album of the Year | Won |
| 1997 | Load | International Album of the Year | Nominated |
| 1998 | ReLoad | Rock Album of the Year | Nominated |
| 1998 | ReLoad | International Album of the Year | Nominated |
| 2004 | St. Anger | Rock Album of the Year | Nominated |
| 2009 | Death Magnetic | Hard Rock/Metal Album of the Year | Won |
| 2017 | Hardwired... to Self-Destruct | Hard Rock/Metal Album of the Year | Won |

== iHeartRadio Music Awards ==
The iHeartRadio Music Awards is an international music awards show founded by iHeartRadio in 2014.

| Year | Nominee / work | Award | Result |
|---|---|---|---|
| 2017 | Hardwired... to Self-Destruct | Rock Album of the Year | Won |
| 2018 | Metallica | Rock Artist of the Year | Won |

== Independent Spirit Awards ==
The Independent Spirit Awards, founded in 1986, are awards dedicated to independent filmmakers.

| Year | Nominee / work | Award | Result |
|---|---|---|---|
| 2004 | Metallica: Some Kind of Monster | Best Documentary Feature | Won |

== International 3D & Advanced Imaging Society's Creative Arts Awards ==
| Year | Nominee / work | Award | Result |
|---|---|---|---|
| 2014 | Metallica: Through the Never | Best 3D Documentary | Won |

== Juno Awards ==
The Juno Awards are presented by the Canadian Academy of Recording Arts and Sciences. Metallica has received three nominations.

| Year | Nominee / work | Award | Result |
|---|---|---|---|
| 1992 | Metallica | Best Selling Album by a Foreign Artist | Nominated |
| 1992 | "Enter Sandman" | Best Selling Single by a Foreign Artist | Nominated |
| 2009 | Death Magnetic | International Album of the Year | Nominated |

== Kerrang! Awards ==
The Kerrang! Awards is an annual awards ceremony held by Kerrang!, a British rock magazine. Metallica has received seven awards.

| Year | Nominee / work | Award | Result |
|---|---|---|---|
| 2003 | Metallica | Best International Band | Won |
| 2003 | Metallica | Kerrang! Hall of Fame | Won |
| 2004 | Metallica | Best Band on the Planet | Won |
| 2008 | Metallica | Inspiration Award Winner | Won |
| 2009 | Death Magnetic | Best Album | Won |
| 2009 | "All Nightmare Long" | Best Single | Nominated |
| 2018 | Metallica | Best International Band | Nominated |
| 2018 | Metallica | Best International Live Act | Nominated |
| 2019 | Metallica | Best International Band | Won |
| 2019 | Metallica | Best International Live Act | Won |

== Libera Music Awards ==
| Year | Nominee / work | Award | Result |
|---|---|---|---|
| 2017 | "Hardwired...To Self-Destruct" | Best Metal/Hard Rock Album | Nominated |

== Los Premios MTV Music Awards ==
| Year | Nominee / work | Award | Result |
|---|---|---|---|
| 2009 | Metallica | Best International Rock Artist | Nominated |

== Metal Edge Readers' Choice Awards ==
| Year | Nominee / work | Award | Result |
|---|---|---|---|
| 1991 | Enter Sandman | Song of the Year | Won |
| 1996 | Until It Sleeps | Song of the Year | Won |
| 1996 | Load | Album of the Year | Won |
| 1997 | ReLoad | Album of the Year | Won |
| 1997 | Metallica | Best Metal/Hard Rock Band | Won |
| 1997 | James Hetfield | Best Vocalist | Won |
| 1997 | Kirk Hammett | Best Guitarist | Won |
| 1997 | Jason Newsted | Best Bassist | Won |
| 1997 | Lars Ulrich | Best Drummer | Won |
| 1997 | Metallica | Best Concert Performance | Won |
| 1997 | The Memory Remains | Best Video Clip | Won |
| 1999 | S&M | Compilation Album of the Year | Won |
| 2000 | I Disappear | Song of the Year From a Movie Soundtrack | Won |
| 2003 | St. Anger | Video of the Year | Won |
| 2003 | James Hetfield | Vocalist of the Year | Won |
| 2003 | Metallica | Comeback of the Year | Won |
| 2003 | Summer Sanitarium 2003 | Tour of the Year | Won |
| 2003 | Metallica | Live Performance of the Year | Won |
| 2003 | James Hetfield | Male Performer of the Year | Won |

== Metal Hammer Awards 'Germany' ==
| Year | Nominee / work | Award | Result |
|---|---|---|---|
| 2009 | Death Magnetic | Best Album | Won |
| 2011 | Lars Ulrich | Legend | Won |
| 2013 | Metallica | Best Live Band | Won |
| 2017 | Metallica | Best International Band | Won |

== Metal Storm Awards ==
| Year | Nominee / work | Award | Result |
|---|---|---|---|
| 2008 | Death Magnetic | The Best Heavy Metal Album | Won |
| 2008 | Death Magnetic | The Biggest Surprise | Won |
| 2016 | Hardwired... to Self-Destruct | The Biggest Surprise | Won |

== Meteor Music Awards ==
The Meteor Music Awards are distributed by MCD Productions and are the national music awards of Ireland. Metallica has received one nomination.

| Year | Nominee / work | Award | Result |
|---|---|---|---|
| 2005 | Metallica | Best International Group | Nominated |

== MTV Europe Music Awards ==
The MTV Europe Music Awards is an annual awards ceremony established in 1994 by MTV Europe. Metallica has received seven nominations.

| Year | Nominee / work | Award | Result |
|---|---|---|---|
| 1994 | Metallica | Best Rock | Nominated |
| 1996 | Metallica | Best Rock | Nominated |
| 2003 | Metallica | Best Group | Nominated |
| 2003 | Metallica | Best Rock | Nominated |
| 2008 | Metallica | Headliner | Nominated |
| 2008 | Metallica | Rock Out | Nominated |
| 2016 | Metallica | Best Rock | Nominated |

== MTV Asia Awards ==
The MTV Asia Awards is an annual Asian awards ceremony established in 2002 by the MTV television network.

| Year | Nominee / work | Award | Result |
|---|---|---|---|
| 2004 | Metallica | Favorite International Rock Act | Nominated |

== MTV Video Music Awards ==
The MTV Video Music Awards is an annual awards ceremony established in 1984 by MTV. Metallica has received two awards from fourteen nominations.

| Year | Nominee / work | Award | Result |
|---|---|---|---|
| 1989 | "One" | Best Heavy Metal Video | Nominated |
| 1992 | "Enter Sandman" | Best Heavy Metal/Hard Rock Video | Won |
| 1992 | "Enter Sandman" | Best Editing in a Video | Nominated |
| 1992 | "Enter Sandman" | Best Cinematography in a Video | Nominated |
| 1996 | "Until it Sleeps" | Best Hard Rock Video | Won |
| 1996 | "Until it Sleeps" | Viewer's Choice | Nominated |
| 1998 | "The Unforgiven II" | Best Rock Video | Nominated |
| 2000 | "I Disappear" | Best Rock Video | Nominated |
| 2000 | "I Disappear" | Best Video from a Film | Nominated |
| 2000 | "I Disappear" | Best Special Effects in a Video | Nominated |
| 2000 | "I Disappear" | Best Editing in a Video | Nominated |
| 2000 | "I Disappear" | Best Cinematography in a Video | Nominated |
| 2003 | "St. Anger" | Best Rock Video | Nominated |
| 2023 | "Lux Æterna" | Best Rock Video | Nominated |

== MTV Video Music Awards Japan ==
The MTV Video Music Awards Japan were established in 2002 and presented by MTV Japan, and are the Japanese version of the MTV Video Music Awards.

| Year | Nominee / work | Award | Result |
|---|---|---|---|
| 2017 | Hardwired | Best Metal Video | Won |

== MTV Video Music Brazil ==
The MTV Video Music Brazil (VMB) was MTV Brazil's annual award ceremony.

| Year | Nominee / work | Award | Result |
|---|---|---|---|
| 2004 | The Unnamed Feeling | Best International Video | Nominated |

== MusiCares ==
| Year | Nominee / work | Award | Result |
|---|---|---|---|
| 2006 | James Hetfield | Stevie Ray Vaughan Award | Won |

== MuchMusic Video Awards ==
The MuchMusic Video Awards is an annual awards ceremony presented by the Canadian music video channel MuchMusic.

| Year | Nominee / work | Award | Result |
|---|---|---|---|
| 2000 | "I Disappear" | Best International Video | Nominated |

== My VH1 Music Awards ==
The My VH1 Music Awards was a short-lived annual awards ceremony established by the VH1 music channel. Metallica has received two awards from two nominations.

| Year | Nominee / work | Award | Result |
|---|---|---|---|
| 2000 | Metallica | Gods of Thunder | Won |
| 2000 | Metallica | Best Stage Spectacle | Won |

== NME Awards ==
The NME Awards are an annual music awards show, founded by the music magazine NME. Metallica has received one award from one nomination.

| Year | Nominee / work | Award | Result |
|---|---|---|---|
| 2017 | Metallica | Best International Band | Won |

== Planet Rock Awards ==
| Year | Nominee / work | Award | Result |
|---|---|---|---|
| 2017 | Hardwired... to Self-Destruct | Best International Album | Won |
| 2018 | Metallica | Best Live Band | Won |

== Playboy Music Poll ==
| Year | Nominee / work | Award | Result |
|---|---|---|---|
| 2000 | Metallica | Best Rock Group | Won |
| 2005 | Some Kind of Monster | Best Soundtrack | Won |
| 2009 | Death Magnetic | Best Rock Album | Won |

== Polar Music Prize ==
The Polar Music Prize is founded by the producer Stig Anderson and is awarded for excellence in music.

| Year | Nominee / work | Award | Result |
|---|---|---|---|
| 2018 | Metallica | For international recognition of excellence in the world of music | Won |

== Pollstar Awards ==
The Pollstar Awards is an annual award ceremony to honor artists and professionals in the concert industry.

| Year | Nominee / work | Award | Result |
|---|---|---|---|
| 2024 | M72 World Tour | Rock Tour Of The Year | Won |

== PRISM Awards ==
The PRISM Awards is a nationally televised awards show recognizing the accurate depiction of drug, alcohol and tobacco use and addiction in movies, television, video, music, interactive and comic book entertainment.

| Year | Nominee / work | Award | Result |
|---|---|---|---|
| 2004 | Frantic | Best Music Video | Won |

== Q Awards ==
The Q Awards are hosted annually by the music magazine Q. Metallica has received one nomination.

| Year | Nominee / work | Award | Result |
|---|---|---|---|
| 2008 | Metallica | Best Act in the World Today | Nominated |

== Radio Music Awards ==
The Radio Music Awards is an annual awards ceremony to honor the most played songs/artists on the radio.

| Year | Nominee / work | Award | Result |
|---|---|---|---|
| 2005 | Metallica | Rock Artist of the Year | Nominated |
| 2005 | Metallica | Alternative Artist of the Year | Nominated |

== Revolver Music Awards ==
The Revolver Music Awards is an annual awards ceremony held by Revolver, an American hard rock and heavy metal magazine.

| Year | Nominee / work | Award | Result |
|---|---|---|---|
| 2009 | Death Magnetic | Album of the Year | Won |
| 2010 | Metallica | Best Live Band | Won |
| 2013 | Metallica | Ronnie James Dio Lifetime Achievement | Won |
| 2016 | Hardwired... to Self-Destruct | Album of the Year | Won |

== Rock and Roll Hall of Fame ==
The Rock and Roll Hall of Fame is an annual awards ceremony established to celebrate the accomplishments of rock and metal artists.

| Year | Nominee / work | Award | Result |
|---|---|---|---|
| 2009 | Metallica | Performer | Won |

== Rock on Request Awards ==
The Rock on Request Awards are hosted annually by the music webzine Rock on Request. Metallica has received two awards.

| Year | Nominee / work | Award | Result |
|---|---|---|---|
| 2008 | Metallica | Best Metal Artist | Won |
| 2009 | Metallica | Best Metal Artist | Won |

== Spike Guys Choice Awards ==
The Guys Choice (formerly known as Spike Guys Choice Awards) is an awards show produced by the Viacom cable channel Spike and held since 2007. The winners were originally chosen based on voting by fans and viewers of the channel until 2015, when the show started presenting the honorees.

| Year | Nominee / work | Award | Result |
|---|---|---|---|
| 2009 | Metallica | Ballsiest Band | Won |

== Swedish Metal Awards ==
| Year | Nominee / work | Award | Result |
|---|---|---|---|
| 2009 | Death Magnetic | Best International Album | Won |

== World Music Awards ==
The World Music Awards is an international awards show founded in 1989 that annually honors recording artists based on worldwide sales figures provided by the International Federation of the Phonographic Industry (IFPI). John Martinotti is an executive producer and co-founder of the show. The awards show is conducted under the patronage of H.S.H. Prince Albert of Monaco, Monte-Carlo.

| Year | Nominee / work | Award | Result |
|---|---|---|---|
| 2008 | "Metallica" | World's Best Selling Rock Act | Nominated |

== ZD Awards ==
Zvukovaya Dorozhka (Russian: Звуковая Дорожка, "sound track") is Russia's oldest hit parade in field of popular music. Since 2003 it is presented in a ceremony in concert halls. It's considered one of the major Russian music awards.

| Year | Nominee / work | Award | Result | Ref. |
|---|---|---|---|---|
| 2015 | Lords of Summer Tour (live at Olimpiysky) | Tour of the Year | Nominated | |
