= Some Kind of Monster =

Some Kind of Monster may refer to:

- "Some Kind of Monster" (song), a song by Metallica
- Some Kind of Monster (EP), an EP by Metallica
- Metallica: Some Kind of Monster, a documentary film titled after the song
