= Madly in Anger with the World Tour =

2003–04 concert tour by Metallica

- World tour by Metallica
- Associated album: St. Anger
- Start date: November 6, 2003
- End date: November 28, 2004
- Legs: 6
- No. of shows: 135
- Box office: $178,650,388

Metallica concert chronology
- Summer Sanitarium Tour (2000; 2003); Madly in Anger with the World Tour (2003–04); Escape from the Studio '06 (2006)

The Madly in Anger with the World Tour was a concert tour by the American heavy metal band Metallica. It supported the band's eighth studio album, St. Anger. The tour lasted over 12 months, beginning in the fall of 2003, performing over 100 shows.

== Background ==
After the June 2003 release of St. Anger, Metallica first made some festival and summer stadium appearances as part of the 2003 Tour rubric; those were the first shows to feature new bassist Robert Trujillo. But the full tour did not properly begin until November 6, 2003, starting at Yoyogi National Gymnasium in Tokyo, running through November 28, 2004, concluding at the HP Pavilion in San Jose, California.

Nearly every performance was professionally recorded and sold online. The download series which began in March 2004 featured each available show in both FLAC and MP3 formats. Drummer Lars Ulrich made a statement advising fans that the series was a continuation of the band's pro-taping stance which was taken in the 1990s.

When Ulrich fell ill before the tour's Download Festival appearance on June 6, 2004, an assortment of temporary fill-ins were recruited, including Slayer's Dave Lombardo, Slipknot's Joey Jordison, and Flemming Larsen, Ulrich's drum technician.

The tour was especially popular in Scandinavia, where stadium dates were held and caused Metallica's entire back catalogue to appear on the record charts.

== Opening acts ==
- Godsmack (Europe—Leg 1, North America)
- Lostprophets (Europe—Leg 2, select dates)
- Slipknot (Europe—Leg 2)
- The Datsuns (Brisbane, Sydney, Melbourne)
- Vader (Chorzów)

== Set list ==
The following setlist was obtained from the June 13, 2004, concert, held at Olympiastadion in Munich, Germany. It does not represent all concerts for the duration of the tour.

1. "Instrumental Sequence" (contains elements of "The Ecstasy of Gold")
2. "Blackened"
3. "Fuel"
4. "For Whom the Bell Tolls"
5. "Instrumental Sequence" (contains elements of "Welcome Home (Sanitarium)")
6. "Fade to Black"
7. "Frantic"
8. "The Memory Remains"
9. "Wherever I May Roam"
10. "Instrumental Sequence"
11. "St. Anger"
12. "Sad but True"
13. "Creeping Death"
14. "Damage, Inc."
15. "Harvester of Sorrow"
16. "Instrumental Sequence"
17. "Nothing Else Matters"
18. "Master of Puppets"
19. "One"
20. "Enter Sandman"

Encore

21. "Dyers Eve"
22. "Seek & Destroy"

== Tour dates ==
List of 2003 concerts
Date	City	Country	Venue
November 6, 2003	Tokyo	Japan	Yoyogi National Gymnasium
November 7, 2003	Tokyo	Japan	Yoyogi National Gymnasium
November 9, 2003	Sapporo	Japan	Makomanai Indoor Stadium
November 11, 2003	Saitama	Japan	Saitama Super Arena
November 13, 2003	Osaka	Japan	Osaka-jō Hall
November 14, 2003	Nagoya	Japan	Nagoya Rainbow Hall
December 2, 2003	Oslo	Norway	Oslo Spektrum
December 3, 2003	Oslo	Norway	Oslo Spektrum
December 5, 2003	Hannover	Germany	Preussag Arena
December 6, 2003	Arnhem	Netherlands	GelreDome
December 8, 2003	Zürich	Switzerland	Hallenstadion
December 9, 2003	Paris	France	Palais Omnisports de Paris-Bercy
December 11, 2003	Bologna	Italy	PalaMalaguti
December 13, 2003	Erfurt	Germany	Messe Erfurt
December 14, 2003	Mannheim	Germany	Mannheimer Maimarkthalle
December 16, 2003	Cologne	Germany	Kölnarena
December 17, 2003	Antwerp	Belgium	Sportpaleis
December 19, 2003	London	England	Earls Court Exhibition Centre
December 20, 2003	London	England	Earls Court Exhibition Centre
December 31, 2003	Las Vegas	United States	The Joint

List of 2004 concerts
Date	City	Country	Venue
January 16, 2004^{[A]}	Auckland	New Zealand	Ericsson Stadium Auckland
January 18, 2004^{[A]}	Gold Coast	Australia	Gold Coast Parklands
January 19, 2004	Brisbane	Australia	Brisbane Entertainment Centre
January 21, 2004	Sydney	Australia	Sydney Entertainment Centre
January 23, 2004^{[A]}	Sydney	Australia	Sydney Showground
January 24, 2004^{[A]}	Sydney	Australia	Sydney Showground
January 26, 2004^{[A]}	Melbourne	Australia	Royal Melbourne Showgrounds
January 28, 2004	Melbourne	Australia	Sidney Myer Music Bowl
January 30, 2004^{[A]}	Adelaide	Australia	Royal Adelaide Showground
February 1, 2004^{[A]}	Perth	Australia	Claremont Showground
March 2, 2004	Phoenix	United States	America West Arena
March 3, 2004	Tucson	United States	Tucson Convention Center Arena
March 5, 2004	Inglewood	United States	The Forum
March 6, 2004	Inglewood	United States	The Forum
March 8, 2004	Daly City	United States	Cow Palace
March 10, 2004	Sacramento	United States	ARCO Arena
March 11, 2004	Reno	United States	Lawlor Events Center
March 13, 2004	Las Vegas	United States	Thomas & Mack Center
March 14, 2004	Fresno	United States	Save Mart Center
March 18, 2004	Portland	United States	Rose Garden Arena
March 20, 2004	Boise	United States	The Pavilion at Boise State
March 21, 2004	Spokane	United States	Spokane Veterans Memorial Arena
March 23, 2004	Edmonton	Canada	Rexall Place
March 24, 2004	Calgary	Canada	Pengrowth Saddledome
March 26, 2004	Vancouver	Canada	General Motors Place
March 28, 2004	Seattle	United States	KeyArena
March 30, 2004	Casper	United States	Casper Events Center
March 31, 2004	Denver	United States	Pepsi Center
April 20, 2004	Uniondale	United States	Nassau Veterans Memorial Coliseum
April 21, 2004	Uniondale	United States	Nassau Veterans Memorial Coliseum
April 23, 2004	Charlotte	United States	Charlotte Coliseum
April 24, 2004	Roanoke	United States	Roanoke Civic Center
April 26, 2004	Norfolk	United States	Norfolk Scope Arena
April 28, 2004	Louisville	United States	Freedom Hall
April 29, 2004	Grand Rapids	United States	Van Andel Arena
May 1, 2004	Cincinnati	United States	U.S. Bank Arena
May 2, 2004	Madison	United States	Alliant Energy Center
May 6, 2004	Calgary	Canada	Pengrowth Saddledome
May 7, 2004	Saskatoon	Canada	Saskatchewan Place
May 9, 2004	Winnipeg	Canada	Winnipeg Arena
May 11, 2004	Kansas City	United States	Kemper Arena
May 12, 2004	Omaha	United States	Qwest Center Arena
May 14, 2004	Oklahoma City	United States	Ford Center
May 15, 2004	Little Rock	United States	Alltel Arena
May 26, 2004	Copenhagen	Denmark	Parken Stadium
May 28, 2004	Helsinki	Finland	Helsinki Olympic Stadium
May 30, 2004	Gothenburg	Sweden	Ullevi
May 31, 2004	Chorzów	Poland	Silesian Stadium
June 2, 2004^{[B]}	Glasgow	Scotland	Glasgow Green
June 4, 2004^{[C]}	Lisbon	Portugal	Bela Vista Park
June 6, 2004^{[B]}	Castle Donington	England	Donington Park
June 8, 2004	Ludwigshafen	Germany	Südweststadion
June 10, 2004	Gelsenkirchen	Germany	Arena AufSchalke
June 11, 2004^{[D]}	Vienna	Austria	Flugfeld Civitas Nova
June 13, 2004	Munich	Germany	Olympiastadion
June 15, 2004	Belgrade	Serbia and Montenegro	Partizan Stadium
June 16, 2004	Bremen	Germany	Weser-Stadion
June 18, 2004	Zürich	Switzerland	Letzigrund
June 19, 2004	Zaragoza	Spain	La Romareda
June 21, 2004	Amsterdam	Netherlands	Amsterdam Arena
June 23, 2004	Paris	France	Parc des Princes
June 25, 2004	Dublin	Ireland	RDS Arena
June 29, 2004	Padua	Italy	Stadio Euganeo
July 1, 2004	Prague	Czech Republic	T-Mobile Park Kolbenova
July 2, 2004^{[E]}	Werchter	Belgium	Rock Werchter
July 4, 2004	Reykjavík	Iceland	Egilshöll
August 16, 2004	Saint Paul	United States	Xcel Energy Center
August 17, 2004	Fargo	United States	Fargodome
August 19, 2004	Indianapolis	United States	Conseco Fieldhouse
August 20, 2004	Milwaukee	United States	Bradley Center
August 22, 2004	Moline	United States	The MARK of the Quad Cities
August 24, 2004	Peoria	United States	Peoria Civic Center Arena
August 25, 2004	Fort Wayne	United States	Allen County War Memorial Coliseum
August 27, 2004	Rosemont	United States	Allstate Arena
August 28, 2004	Rosemont	United States	Allstate Arena
August 30, 2004	Ames	United States	Hilton Coliseum
September 1, 2004	Wichita	United States	Britt Brown Arena
September 3, 2004	Austin	United States	Frank Erwin Center
September 4, 2004	Lubbock	United States	United Spirit Arena
September 21, 2004	Cleveland	United States	Gund Arena
September 22, 2004	Pittsburgh	United States	Mellon Arena
September 24, 2004	Columbus	United States	Value City Arena
September 25, 2004	St. Louis	United States	Savvis Center
September 27, 2004	Green Bay	United States	Resch Center
October 1, 2004	Auburn Hills	United States	The Palace of Auburn Hills
October 3, 2004	Montreal	Canada	Bell Centre
October 4, 2004	Montreal	Canada	Bell Centre
October 6, 2004	Toronto	Canada	Air Canada Centre
October 7, 2004	Ottawa	Canada	Corel Centre
October 9, 2004	Albany	United States	Pepsi Arena
October 10, 2004	Buffalo	United States	HSBC Arena
October 14, 2004	Quebec City	Canada	Colisée Pepsi
October 15, 2004	Quebec City	Canada	Colisée Pepsi
October 17, 2004	Washington, D.C.	United States	MCI Center
October 19, 2004	Philadelphia	United States	Wachovia Center
October 20, 2004	Philadelphia	United States	Wachovia Center
October 22, 2004	East Rutherford	United States	Continental Airlines Arena
October 24, 2004	Boston	United States	FleetCenter
October 25, 2004	Boston	United States	FleetCenter
October 27, 2004	Hamilton	Canada	Copps Coliseum
October 28, 2004	London	Canada	John Labatt Centre
November 5, 2004	Tampa	United States	St. Pete Times Forum
November 6, 2004	Miami	United States	Office Depot Center
November 8, 2004	Jacksonville	United States	Jacksonville Veterans Memorial Arena
November 9, 2004	Pensacola	United States	Pensacola Civic Center
November 11, 2004	Nashville	United States	Gaylord Entertainment Center
November 13, 2004	Duluth	United States	The Arena at Gwinnett Center
November 14, 2004	New Orleans	United States	New Orleans Arena
November 16, 2004	Houston	United States	Toyota Center
November 17, 2004	Dallas	United States	American Airlines Center
November 20, 2004	San Antonio	United States	SBC Center
November 22, 2004	Salt Lake City	United States	E Center
November 24, 2004	San Diego	United States	San Diego Sports Arena
November 27, 2004	Anaheim	United States	Arrowhead Pond
November 28, 2004	San Jose	United States	HP Pavilion

Festivals and other miscellaneous performances
^{A} This concert was a part of "Big Day Out"
^{B} This concert was a part of the "Download Festival"
^{C} This concert was a part of "Rock in Rio Rock in Rio Lisboa"
^{D} This concert was a part of the "Aerodrome Festival"
^{E} This concert was a part of "Rock Werchter"

Cancellations and rescheduled shows

October 25, 2003	Buenos Aires, Argentina	River Plate Stadium	Cancelled
October 28, 2003	Santiago, Chile	Pista Atlética del Estadio Nacional	Cancelled
October 30, 2003	Rio de Janeiro, Brazil	ATL Hall	Cancelled
November 1, 2003	São Paulo, Brazil	Pacaembu Stadium	Cancelled
May 14, 2004	Norman, Oklahoma	Lloyd Noble Center	Moved to the Ford Center in Oklahoma City, Oklahoma
June 27, 2004	Zagreb, Croatia	Stadion Maksimir	Cancelled

=== Box office score data ===
Venue	City	Tickets sold / available	Gross revenue
America West Arena	Phoenix	16,778 / 16,778 (100%)	$931,315
Tucson Convention Center Arena	Tucson	8,514 / 8,514 (100%)	$502,210
The Forum	Inglewood	32,455 / 33,674 (96%)	$1,797,450
Cow Palace	Daly City	16,000 / 16,000 (100%)	$888,000
ARCO Arena	Sacramento	12,545 / 13,500 (93%)	$754,075
Lawlor Events Center	Reno	7,944 / 8,500 (93%)	$437,906
Thomas & Mack Center	Las Vegas	13,270 / 16,808 (79%)	$797,055
Save Mart Center	Fresno	12,751 / 15,143 (84%)	$728,774
Rose Garden	Portland	11,064 / 16,000 (69%)	$605,360
Spokane Veterans Memorial Arena	Spokane	9,179 / 11,000 (83%)	$531,010
KeyArena	Seattle	13,222 / 13,222 (100%)	$750,800
Nassau Veterans Memorial Coliseum	Uniondale	30,205 / 34,196 (88%)	$1,815,950
Freedom Hall	Louisville	11,802 / 17,726 (67%)	$646,980
Van Andel Arena	Grand Rapids	12,550 / 12,550 (100%)	$754,950
U.S. Bank Arena	Cincinnati	13,640 / 13,640 (100%)	$770,880
Alliant Energy Center	Madison	10,120 / 10,120 (100%)	$646,750
Pengrowth Saddledome	Calgary	16,646 / 16,646 (100%)	$927,515
Saskatchewan Place	Saskatoon	13,035 / 13,035 (100%)	$578,744
Winnipeg Arena	Winnipeg	14,911 / 14,911 (100%)	$642,503
Kemper Arena	Kansas City	14,631 / 18,893 (77%)	$853,836
Qwest Center Arena	Omaha	15,000 / 15,000 (100%)	$856,420
Ford Center	Oklahoma City	13,502 / 19,204 (70%)	$767,610
Alltel Arena	North Little Rock	11,830 / 14,200 (83%)	$690,650
Xcel Energy Center	Saint Paul	17,555 / 17,555 (100%)	$994,125
Bradley Center	Milwaukee	14,179 / 18,000 (79%)	$788,195
Allstate Arena	Rosemont	30,941 / 30,941 (100%)	$1,785,995
Britt Brown Arena	Valley Center	8,485 / 11,236 (76%)	$493,780
United Spirit Arena	Lubbock	9,593 / 15,453 (62%)	$539,515
Gund Arena	Cleveland	15,559 / 21,190 (73%)	$865,050
Mellon Arena	Pittsburgh	9,816 / 9,816 (100%)	$564,700
Value City Arena	Columbus	11,002 / 18,000 (61%)	$606,980
Savvis Center	St. Louis	7,864 / 10,000 (79%)	$431,610
Resch Center	Green Bay	9,976 / 9,976 (100%)	$567,920
The Palace of Auburn Hills	Auburn Hills	14,866 / 19,712 (75%)	$844,195
Bell Centre	Montreal	40,277 / 40,277 (100%)	$2,457,793
Air Canada Centre	Toronto	18,531 / 18,531 (100%)	$1,119,555
Corel Centre	Ottawa	12,875 / 12,875 (100%)	$782,333
Pepsi Arena	Albany	13,148 / 15,835 (83%)	$776,208
HSBC Arena	Buffalo	14,687 / 18,954 (77%)	$837,865
Colisée Pepsi	Quebec City	30,523 / 30,523 (100%)	$1,971,563
MCI Center	Washington, D.C.	15,367 / 17,531 (88%)	$924,926
Wachovia Center	Philadelphia	31,198 / 38,998 (96%)	$1,781,540
Continental Airlines Arena	East Rutherford	18,986 / 18,986 (100%)	$1,090,490
FleetCenter	Boston	26,396 / 34,014 (78%)	$1,504,100
Copps Coliseum	Hamilton	6,722 / 10,000 (67%)	$424,662
John Labatt Centre	London	10,211 / 10,211 (100%)	$631,458
St. Pete Times Forum	Tampa	13,792 / 13,792 (100%)	$745,346
Office Depot Center	Sunrise	12,836 / 20,522 (63%)	$758,194
Jacksonville Veterans Memorial Arena	Jacksonville	5,363 / 5,992 (90%)	$314,225
Pensacola Civic Center	Pensacola	8,341 / 8,700 (96%)	$469,790
Gaylord Entertainment Center	Nashville	9,663 / 10,841 (89%)	$500,645
The Arena at Gwinnett Center	Duluth	12,347 / 12,347 (100%)	$710,237
New Orleans Arena	New Orleans	11,493 / 14,800 (78%)	$625,920
Toyota Center	Houston	12,596 / 16,800 (75%)	$697,800
San Diego Sports Arena	San Diego	13,747 / 13,890 (99%)	$809,800
Arrowhead Pond	Anaheim	15,900 / 15,900 (100%)	$867,475
HP Pavilion	San Jose	13,239 / 17,890 (96%)	$689,655
TOTAL		849,668 / 969,348 (88%)	$48,650,388

== Personnel ==
- James Hetfield – vocals, rhythm guitar
- Kirk Hammett – lead guitar, backing vocals
- Lars Ulrich – drums
- Robert Trujillo – bass, backing vocals
