= Pretty Paper =

Pretty Paper may refer to:

- Pretty Paper (album), a 1979 Christmas album by Willie Nelson
- "Pretty Paper" (song), a 1963 song by Willie Nelson, originally recorded by Roy Orbison
- Pretty Paper (novel), a Christmas novel co-written by Willie Nelson and David Ritz
