= It's a Long Story: My Life =

Book by Willie Nelson

- Author: Willie Nelson, David Ritz
- Language: English
- Subject: Autobiography
- Publisher: Little, Brown and Company
- Publication date: 2015
- Publication place: United States
- Media type: Print (Hardcover, Paperback)
- Pages: 400 pages (hardcover)
- ISBN: 978-0-316-40355-9
- Preceded by: Roll Me Up and Smoke Me When I Die: Musings from the Road
- Followed by: Pretty Paper

It's A Long Story: My Life is a 2015 autobiography by country music singer-songwriter Willie Nelson co-authored with David Ritz.

== Content ==
The book is the second autobiography written by Nelson, after the 1988 release of Willie: An Autobiography. In October 2013, Little, Brown and Company announced the publishing of the new book for 2015, calling it "an unvarnished story" of the singer.

Co-authored with David Ritz, the book was promoted as "the definitive autobiography of Willie Nelson".
