= St. Anger =

Studio album by Metallica
- Released: June 5, 2003
- Recorded: April 23 – July 2001; May 2002 – April 8, 2003
- Studios: Presidio (San Francisco); Metallica's HQ (San Rafael)
- Genres: Alternative metal; nu metal
- Length: 75:01
- Labels: Elektra; Vertigo
- Producers: Bob Rock; Metallica

Metallica chronology
S&M (1999)	St. Anger (2003)	Death Magnetic (2008)

Singles from St. Anger
- 1. "St. Anger" Released: June 23, 2003; 2. "Frantic" Released: September 15, 2003; 3. "The Unnamed Feeling" Released: January 12, 2004; 4. "Some Kind of Monster" Released: July 13, 2004

St. Anger is the eighth studio album by American heavy metal band Metallica, released on June 5, 2003, through Elektra Records in the United States and Vertigo Records elsewhere. It was the last Metallica album released through Elektra and the final collaboration between Metallica and longtime producer Bob Rock, with whom the band had worked since 1990. This is also Metallica's only album without an official bassist, as Jason Newsted left the band prior to the recording sessions. Rock played in Newsted's place, while Robert Trujillo joined the band following its completion. Although he does not play on the album, Trujillo is listed as a member in the liner notes and appears in photos with the band in the album's booklet.

Recording began in April 2001 but was postponed after rhythm guitarist and vocalist James Hetfield entered rehabilitation for alcoholism and various other addictions, and did not resume until May 2002. The recording is the subject of the 2004 documentary film Metallica: Some Kind of Monster. St. Anger departed from Metallica's signature style with an alternative metal style, raw production, metallic drum sound, and devoid of their usual guitar solos. The artwork was created by frequent Metallica collaborator Pushead.

St. Anger was intended for release on June 10, 2003, but was released five days earlier due to concerns over unlicensed distribution via peer-to-peer file sharing networks. Despite mixed reviews, it debuted at the top of sales charts in 14 countries, including the US Billboard 200. Metallica spent two years touring to promote the album. In 2004, the lead single, "St. Anger", won a Grammy Award for Best Metal Performance. St. Anger was certified double platinum by the Recording Industry Association of America (RIAA) for shipping two million copies in the US; it has sold nearly six million copies worldwide.

== Recording and musical style ==
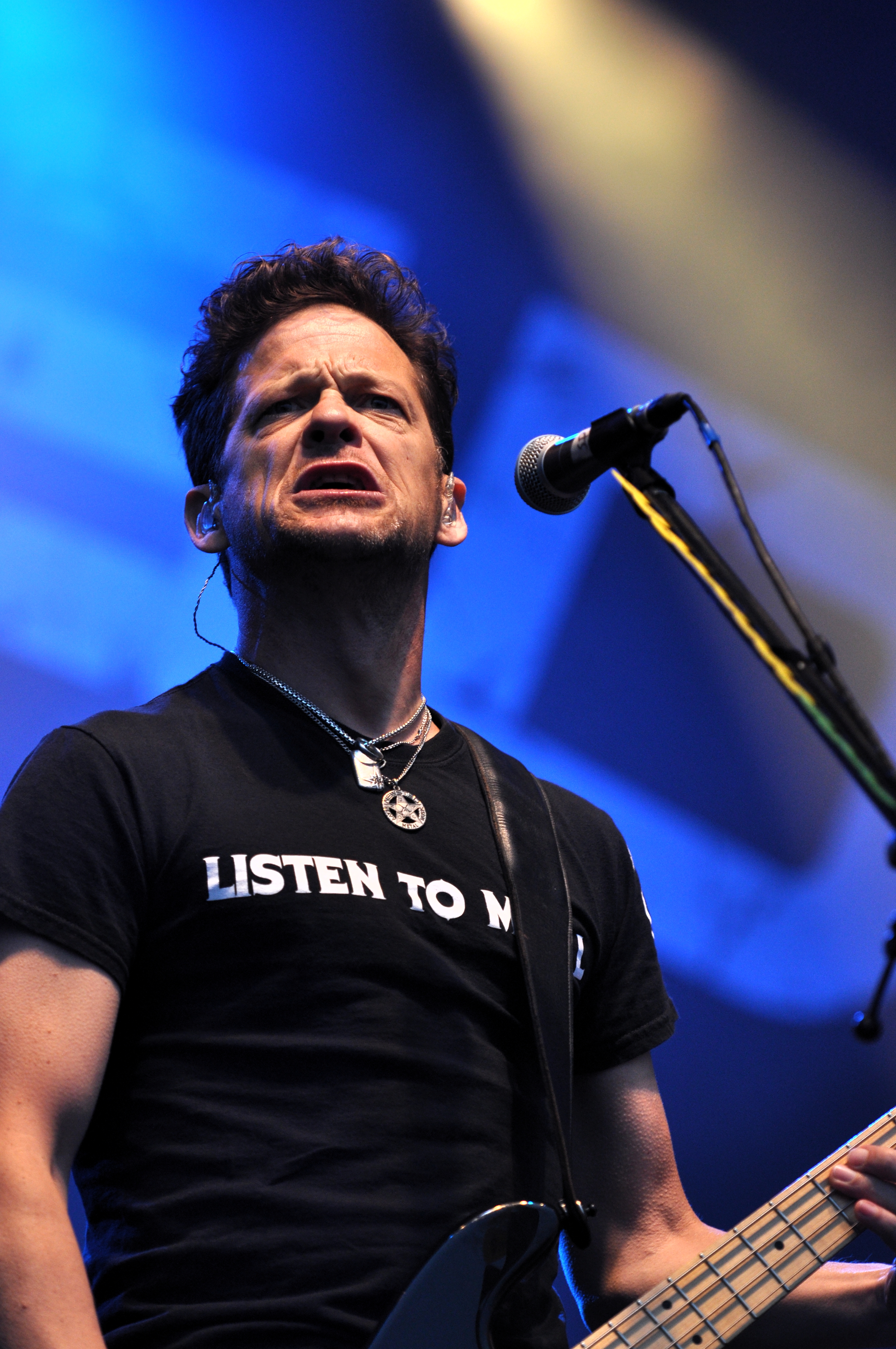
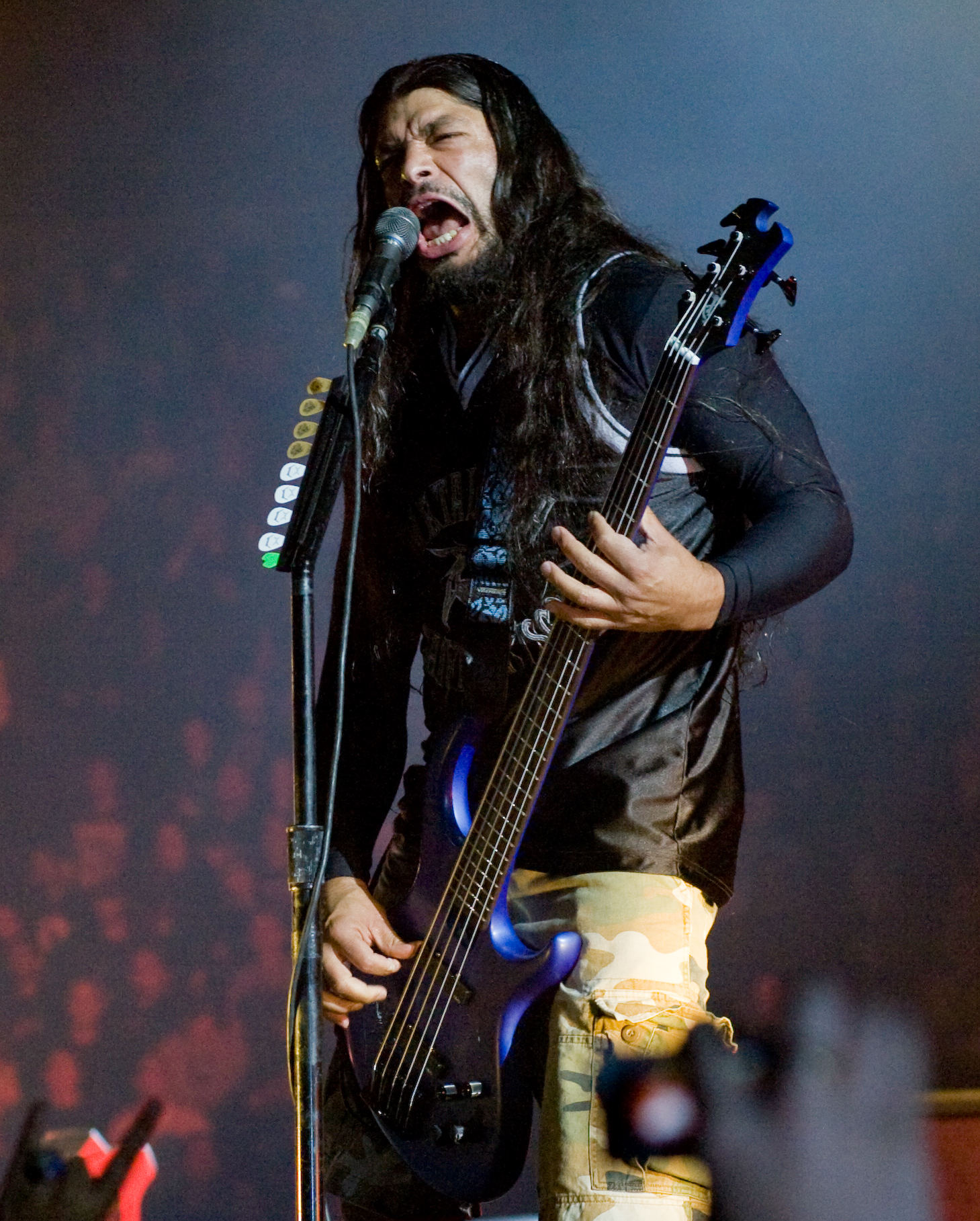
After the departure of Jason Newsted (left) in 2001, Robert Trujillo became Metallica's new bassist in February 2003 and toured with the band in support of St. Anger.

Metallica rented an old United States Army barracks on the Presidio of San Francisco, and converted it into a makeshift studio in January 2001. As plans were being made to begin writing and recording their first album in nearly five years, the band postponed the recording because of bassist Jason Newsted's departure from Metallica on January 17, 2001, with Newsted stating his departure was due to "private and personal reasons and the physical damage I have done to myself over the years while playing the music that I love". Due to the difficulty in immediately finding or auditioning for a replacement for Newsted to write and record with so close to the rescheduled sessions, Metallica accepted an offer from Bob Rock to play bass on the album in Newsted's place, and stated they would find an official bass player upon the album's completion. In February 2003, as St. Anger was nearing completion, Metallica hired Robert Trujillo as their new bassist. He appeared on the footage of studio rehearsals of St. Anger in its entirety, which was included on DVD in the album package.

In July 2001, recording came to a halt when James Hetfield entered rehab for alcoholism and other undisclosed addictions. Hetfield returned to the band in December 2001, but was only allowed to work on the album from noon to 4:00 PM as the band resumed recording on April 12, 2002. Due to his personal problems, as well as Metallica's internal struggles, the band hired a personal enhancement coach, Phil Towle. This, and the recording of the album, was documented by filmmakers Joe Berlinger and Bruce Sinofsky and released in 2004 as the film Metallica: Some Kind of Monster. Metallica abandoned their Presidio studio and instead recorded at a new studio in San Rafael, California, known as "HQ", from May 2002 until April 2003. 15 tracks from the Presidio sessions were ultimately unused.

Hetfield stated that the album was written with "a lot of passion". He said, "There's two years of condensed emotion in this. We've gone through a lot of personal changes, struggles, epiphanies, it's deep. It's so deep lyrically and musically. [St. Anger] is just the best that it can be from us right now." The band purposely wanted a raw sound on the album, so that Rock did not polish the sound while mixing. The band desired the raw sound because of the depth of the emotion they felt and did not want to "mess with it". Rock commented, "I wanted to do something to shake up radio and the way everything else sounds. To me, this album sounds like four guys in a garage getting together and writing rock songs. There was really no time to get amazing performances out of James. We liked the raw performances. And we didn't do what everyone does and what I've been guilty of for a long time, which is tuning vocals. We just did it, boom, and that was it." The album represented Bob Rock's first ever all-digital project, even though analogue was used for mastering, he said: "The digital just sounded good," he explains. "It was so raw and in-your-face, and the guys really loved it. Kirk didn't want to go back to analogue and soften the guitars. If you stood in front of his amp, that sound was coming through an NS10, and if you go into your car and listen, it still sounds the same. It sounds like you're right in front of his speaker cabinet. Good or bad, that's what you're hearing, and he loved that, so we wanted to retain it."

With the guitars recorded in Drop C tuning, (with the exceptions of "Dirty Window", "Invisible Kid" and "The Unnamed Feeling", in drop C#, G# and A#, respectively), St. Anger is seen as a departure from the band's previous work, described as alternative metal and nu metal. The album also uses strong elements of groove metal and speed metal. Guitarist Kirk Hammett commented on the lack of guitar solos on St. Anger, a departure for Metallica: "We wanted to preserve the sound of all four of us in a room just jamming. We tried to put guitar solos on, but we kept on running into this problem. It really sounded like an afterthought." Hammett said that he was happy with the final product. Rock stated, "We made a promise to ourselves that we'd only keep stuff that had integrity. We didn't want to make a theatrical statement by adding overdubs." Lars Ulrich recorded his drums with his snare drums turned off, resulting in a drum tone with far more "ring" than is common in rock music. Ulrich said, "One day I forgot to turn the snare on because I wasn't thinking about this stuff. At the playbacks, I decided I was really liking what I was hearing—it had a different ambience. It sang back to me in a beautiful way." Rock said the group spent only "15 minutes" on the drum sound, with fewer microphones than usual.

== Artwork ==
Brian Schroeder designed the album cover and interior artwork for St. Anger. Schroeder has designed a number of items for Metallica in the past, including liner artwork of ...And Justice for All, several single covers, and many T-shirts; however, the album marks his first studio album cover art for the band. Originally, according to Metallica's official website, four different limited color variations of the cover were planned, but the idea was eventually scrapped.

== Release and promotion ==
St. Anger was released on June 5, 2003. It was originally scheduled for June 10, but due to Metallica's previous battle with Napster and fear that it would be released illegally onto peer-to-peer file sharing networks, the band pushed the release date ahead by five days. A special edition of the album was released with a bonus DVD, featuring live, in-the-studio rehearsals of all of the St. Anger tracks. First week sales of the album were 417,000 copies, and it debuted at number 1 on the U.S. Billboard 200, as well as in 30 other countries around the world. In 2004, Metallica won the Grammy Award for Best Metal Performance for the title track.

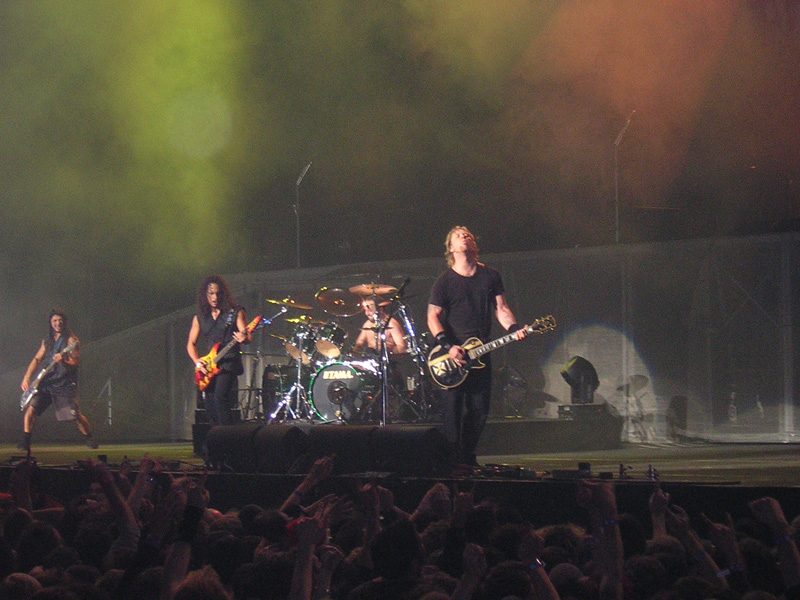
Metallica playing live in support of St. Anger

After St. Anger's release, Metallica embarked on a tour that lasted nearly two years. The first leg was the U.S. 2003 Summer Sanitarium Tour with support from Limp Bizkit, Deftones, Linkin Park, and Mudvayne. After Summer Sanitarium, the band began the Madly in Anger with the World Tour with support from Godsmack, Lostprophets, and Slipknot (both on certain European dates), which lasted until late 2004. The St. Anger songs "Frantic", "St. Anger", "Dirty Window" and "The Unnamed Feeling" were performed frequently during the tour. "Some Kind of Monster" was also played live, but not as often as other songs on the album, and “Sweet Amber” was played only once. The album tracks were altered when played live; sometimes they were shortened, or in some cases a guitar solo was added. Sometimes, only one song from the album was played live.

By 2009, the songs from St. Anger were completely absent from Metallica's set lists. After "Frantic" was performed on October 21, 2008, songs from the album would entirely disappear from set lists on major tours,. However, it and "Dirty Window" were performed again on December 10, 2011, during the last concert of Metallica's 30th Anniversary Concerts in San Francisco, California. "St. Anger" was also played again during the "Metallica by Request" tour in 2014 when the fans voted for it, and also occasionally during concerts in 2014 and 2015. In October 2007, "All Within My Hands" was performed live for the first time, albeit rearranged and acoustically, at both nights of the Bridge School Benefit concerts; it would be performed similarly in November 2018 at the All Within My Hands Foundation's Helping Hands concert in San Francisco, and again in September 2019 during the S&M2 concert, also in San Francisco. On May 1, 2019, "Frantic" was performed on the WorldWired Tour in Lisbon, Portugal after many years of absence. It and the title track would be performed regularly on this leg of the tour. "Frantic" and "Dirty Window" were played during the 40th Anniversary shows in San Francisco in December 2021.

Metallica also released four singles from St. Anger. The order of the releases was: "St. Anger", "Frantic", "The Unnamed Feeling" and "Some Kind of Monster". On the U.S. Mainstream Rock chart, these singles charted at number 2, number 21, number 28 and number 19, respectively. Promotional music videos were also made for all four of the songs. These videos can be found on Metallica's DVD video collection, titled The Videos 1989-2004, and the video for "Some Kind of Monster" can also be found on the film Some Kind of Monster.

== Critical reception ==
Professional ratings
Aggregate scores
Source	Rating
Metacritic	65/100
Review scores
Source	Rating
AllMusic	3/5 stars
Blender	4/5 stars
Encyclopedia of Popular Music	2/5 stars
Entertainment Weekly	B+
NME	9/10
Pitchfork	0.8/10
Rolling Stone	4/5 stars
The Rolling Stone Album Guide	2.5/5 stars
Spin	8/10
Uncut	4/5 stars

St. Anger received polarized reviews from critics; the album holds a score of 65 out of 100, based on 20 reviews, on review-aggregating website Metacritic. Adrien Begrand of PopMatters noted positive and negative aspects of the album, saying, "While it's an ungodly mess at times, what you hear on this album is a band playing with passion for the first time in years." Talking about the album, Greg Kot of Blender said, "It may be too late to rehabilitate Metallica's image, but once again, their music is all about bringing the carnage." Writing for NME, Ian Watson said that, "the songs are a stripped back, heroically brutal reflection of this fury. You get the sense that, as with their emotional selves, they've taken metal apart and started again from scratch. There's no space wasted here, no time for petty guitar solos or downtuned bass trickery, just a focused, relentless attack." Johnny Loftus of AllMusic praised the album and described it as a "punishing, unflinching document of internal struggle—taking listeners inside the bruised yet vital body of Metallica, but ultimately revealing the alternately torturous and defiant demons that wrestle inside Hetfield's brain. St. Anger is an immediate record." Barry Walter of Rolling Stone magazine also had a positive reaction to the direction taken on St. Anger, stating: "No wonder there's an authenticity to St. Anger's fury that none of the band's rap-metal followers can touch." He also went further to note the lack of commercial influence and modern rock aspects of previous albums, continuing: "There's no radio-size, four-minute rock here, no pop-friendly choruses, no ballads, no solos, no wayward experimentation." However, in 2023, Rolling Stone marked St. Anger as number 43 on their list of 50 horrible albums by brilliant artists, calling it "a deeply disappointing album".

Although some reviews of St. Anger were positive, other reviewers had a strong distaste for the album. Brent DiCrescenzo of Pitchfork criticized Ulrich and Hammett, saying that Ulrich was "playing a drum set consisting of steel drums, aluminum toms, programmed double kicks, and a broken church bell. The kit's high-end clamor ignored the basic principles of drumming: timekeeping," he added, "Hetfield and Hammett's guitars underwent more processing than cat food. When they both speedstrummed through St. Anger, and most other movements, [Hetfield and Hammett] seemed to overwhelm each other with different, terrible noise. Also the duration of most songs made it boring to hear them." Phil Freeman of Houston Press characterized the album as having, "stolen Helmet riffs and lyrics that sound co-written by Hetfield's AA sponsor." Playlouder reviewer William Luff cited the album's 75-minute length and sound ("a monolithic slab of noise") as reasoning that St. Anger was "just too dense and daunting to be truly enjoyable." PopMatters reporter Michael Christopher said "St. Anger dispenses with the recent spate of radio friendly pleasantries in favor of pedal to the floor thrash, staggered and extended song structures, quick changes and a muddled production that tries to harken back to the Kill 'Em All days. All attempts fail miserably."

The album's snare drum sound was widely criticized. Ulrich dismissed the criticism as "closed-minded", and in July 2020 he said, "I stand behind it 100% because, at that moment, that was the truth". In 2017, Hetfield said, "There are things I would like to change on some of the records, but it gives them so much character that you can’t change them ... St. Anger could use a little less tin snare drum, but those things are what make those records part of our history."

In 2014, Tom Hawking of Flavorwire included the album in his list of "The 50 Worst Albums Ever Made", in which he said: "When your most productive band member is the life coach you’re paying $10,000 a week, you’ve got problems."

== Track listing ==
All tracks are written by James Hetfield, Lars Ulrich, Kirk Hammett and Bob Rock.

St. Anger track listing
No.	Title	Length
1.	"Frantic"	5:50
2.	"St. Anger"	7:21
3.	"Some Kind of Monster"	8:25
4.	"Dirty Window"	5:24
5.	"Invisible Kid"	8:30
6.	"My World"	5:45
7.	"Shoot Me Again"	7:10
8.	"Sweet Amber"	5:27
9.	"The Unnamed Feeling"	7:08
10.	"Purify"	5:13
11.	"All Within My Hands"	8:48
Total length:		75:01

== Personnel ==
Metallica

- James Hetfield – vocals, guitars
- Lars Ulrich – drums
- Kirk Hammett – guitars
- Robert Trujillo (credited but does not perform)

Additional musician

- Bob Rock – bass guitar

Technicial personnel

- Bob Rock – production, engineering, mixing
- Metallica – production, album design
- Mike Gillies – engineering and mixing assistance, digital engineering
- Eric Helmkamp – engineering and mixing assistance
- Vlado Meller – mastering
- Pushead – cover illustration
- Anton Corbijn – photography
- Brad Klausen – production design
- Matt Mahurin – St. Anger illustration, James Hetfield and Kirk Hammett images
- Forhelvede Productions – Lars Ulrich image
- Pascal Brun – Robert Trujillo image
- Comenius Röthlisberger – Robert Trujillo image

== Charts ==
=== Weekly charts ===
2003 weekly chart performance
Chart (2003)	Peak position
Australian Albums (ARIA)	1
Austrian Albums (Ö3 Austria)	1
Belgian Albums (Ultratop Flanders)	1
Belgian Albums (Ultratop Wallonia)	3
Canadian Albums (Billboard)	1
Canadian Metal Albums (Nielsen SoundScan)	1
Danish Albums (Hitlisten)	1
Dutch Albums (Album Top 100)	2
Finnish Albums (Suomen virallinen lista)	1
French Albums (SNEP)	1
German Albums (Offizielle Top 100)	1
Greek Albums (IFPI)	1
Hungarian Albums (MAHASZ)	1
Irish Albums (IRMA)	1
Italian Albums (FIMI)	2
Japanese Albums (Oricon)	1
New Zealand Albums (RMNZ)	1
Norwegian Albums (VG-lista)	1
Polish Albums (ZPAV)	1
Portuguese Albums (AFP)	1
Scottish Albums (Official Charts)	2
Singaporean Albums (RIAS)	2
Spanish Albums (AFYVE)	2
Swedish Albums (Sverigetopplistan)	1
Swiss Albums (Schweizer Hitparade)	2
UK Albums (Official Charts)	3
US Billboard 200	1

=== Year-end charts ===
2003 year-end chart performance
Chart (2003)	Position
Australian Albums (ARIA)	32
Austrian Albums (Ö3 Austria)	18
Belgian Albums (Ultratop Flanders)	10
Belgian Alternative Albums (Ultratop Flanders)	4
Belgian Albums (Ultratop Wallonia)	46
Danish Albums (Hitlisten)	38
Dutch Albums (Album Top 100)	24
Finnish Albums (Suomen virallinen lista)	1
French Albums (SNEP)	129
German Albums (Offizielle Top 100)	10
Hungarian Albums (MAHASZ)	31
Italian Albums (FIMI)	38
New Zealand Albums (RMNZ)	39
Swedish Albums (Sverigetopplistan)	10
Swedish Albums & Compilations (Sverigetopplistan)	14
Swiss Albums (Schweizer Hitparade)	9
UK Albums (OCC)	95
US Billboard 200	38
Worldwide Albums (IFPI)	18

== Certifications ==
Sales certifications for St. Anger
Region	Certification	Certified units/sales
Argentina (CAPIF)	Gold	20,000^{^}
Australia (ARIA)	3× Platinum	210,000^{‡}
Austria (IFPI Austria)	Platinum	30,000^{*}
Belgium (BRMA)	Gold	25,000^{*}
Brazil (Pro-Música Brasil)	Gold	50,000^{*}
Canada (Music Canada)	2× Platinum	200,000^{^}
Denmark (IFPI Danmark)	Gold	20,000^{^}
Finland (Musiikkituottajat)	Platinum	35,725
France (SNEP)	Gold	100,000^{*}
Germany (BVMI)	2× Platinum	400,000^{^}
Greece (IFPI Greece)	Gold	10,000^{^}
Hungary (MAHASZ)	Gold	10,000^{^}
Japan (RIAJ)	Gold	100,000^{^}
Netherlands (NVPI)	Gold	40,000^{^}
New Zealand (RMNZ)	2× Platinum	30,000^{^}
Norway (IFPI Norway)	Platinum	40,000^{*}
Poland (ZPAV)	Gold	35,000^{*}
Portugal (AFP)	Gold	20,000^{^}
Russia (NFPF)	Platinum	20,000^{*}
Sweden (GLF)	Platinum	60,000^{^}
Switzerland (IFPI Switzerland)	Platinum	40,000^{^}
United Kingdom (BPI)	Gold	100,000^{^}
United States (RIAA)	2× Platinum	2,000,000^{^}
Summaries
Europe (IFPI)	Platinum	1,000,000^{*}
Worldwide	—	6,000,000
^{*} Sales figures based on certification alone.^{^} Shipments figures based on certification alone.^{‡} Sales+streaming figures based on certification alone.
