= Metallica Saved My Life =

2025 documentary film

- Directed by: Jonas Åkerlund
- Written by: Jonas Åkerlund
- Produced by: Alice Webb; Jonas Åkerlund
- Starring: James Hetfield; Lars Ulrich; Kirk Hammett; Robert Trujillo; Jason Momoa; Tony Hawk
- Cinematography: Eric Broms
- Edited by: Ben Wainwright-Pearce; Marcus Eriksson
- Release date: June 11, 2025 (Tribeca)
- Running time: 120 minutes
- Country: United States
- Language: English

Metallica Saved My Life is a 2025 American documentary film, directed by Jonas Åkerlund. The film profiles the fans of the band Metallica from all around the world and their stories of how the band helped them through tough times.

The film premiered on June 11, 2025, at the Tribeca Festival and screened through select cities during the band's M72 World Tour.

== Background ==
Metallica singer and guitarist James Hetfield notes that American comedian and friend of the band Jim Breuer inspired the project by saying, "James, you have got to hear these fricking stories, they're unbelievable - where these people came from, how they got into music and why."

== Synopsis ==
The film documents die-hard fans of Metallica and how the band give each of them a sense of identity and hope. It covers four decades of fandom and the found family each has from other Metallica fans.

Some of the fans' stories that were shared:

- A fan feeling teased and taunted for not fitting the stereotype of listening to Metallica
- A fan finding comfort in the music while growing up in a civil war
- A couple whom one of them got into a motorcycle accident and finding the motivation for rehabilitation in attending a Metallica concert
- Fans who are metal cowboys from Botswana
- Fans in Japan

What connects them all together is the sense of community, and one fan summarizes it as: "Metallica is all of us together. [...] It belongs to all of us."

The film also covers some of the struggles the band has gone through, like Hetfield's insecurity and time in rehabilitation.

== See also ==
- Metallica: Some Kind of Monster
