= Mars Music =

American musical instrument retailer

Mars Music, Inc. was a chain of music stores based in Fort Lauderdale, Florida. The company was founded in 1996 by guitarist and former Office Depot president Mark Begelman, who created the superstore store chain after experiencing dissatisfaction with his own music store shopping experiences. MARS was initially an acronym for "Music And Recording Superstore." At its peak following an aggressive expansion plan, Mars Music consisted of 49 stores in 20 states and was the second largest company of its kind in the US, but the company went out of business in late 2002 after over-expansion, struggles to raise additional capital, and a failed reorganization attempt.

== Company history ==
Mark Begelman began Mars Music with the purchase of the five-store Ace Music store chain in south Florida. He had gone into one of the Ace Music locations to try a guitar amplifier, but a salesperson told him he couldn't turn up the volume, and that if he purchased it and didn't like it, he wouldn't be able to get a refund. Frustrated with his shopping experience and music stores' limited product selection, lack of clear pricing, and store personnel who wouldn't allow customers to try the merchandise, he used $10 million of his own funds to start Mars Music. The company slogan was "We love it when you touch the stuff" and the chain offered a 45-day return policy.

A retail superstore concept, Mars Music had a wide selection of music instruments and pro audio equipment clearly priced on display for customers to try in large stores, each with practice rooms, a recording studio, and a performance stage, all with the slogan "We love when you touch the stuff."

Mars Music stores included a "Learning Center" where instrument lessons for individuals and groups were taught, including the "Babies Make Music" early childhood music program and "Weekend Warriors" program designed for adults who want to play on the weekends. At one point, Mars Music was the largest provider of private music lessons in the US. Mars also introduced interactive online instrument lessons with pitch recognition technologies that were new at the time.

A related charitable organization, the Mars Music Foundation, operated to grant music lessons and the "In Tune With Kids" program that accepted instrument donations, then reconditioned and donated the instruments to area schools.

== Partnerships and sponsorships ==
In January 2000, Mars Music entered into an agreement with SFX Entertainment, paying $3.3 million to secure the naming rights of the Coral Sky Amphitheatre for six years, renaming it the Mars Music Amphitheatre. However, Mars declared bankruptcy two years later, and the facility returned to its original name.

The Mars Music e-commerce division, marsmusic.com, co-sponsored Metallica's Summer Sanitarium Tour in the summer of 2000, including online fan chats and a live concert webcast.

Mars Music launched a record label named Martian Records, a partnership between Mars Music and Chris Blackwell's Palm Pictures. The first and only act signed to the label was Seven Channels, selected through a contest that generated over 3,000 submissions from hopeful unsigned acts.

== Expansion and bankruptcy ==
In 2000, Mars expected to gross $300 million in sales and was planning for a future initial public offering. In April of that year, Mars launched their e-commerce website, marsmusic.com. But as expansion costs exceeded shrinking venture capital markets following the dot-com bubble and subsequent stock market downturn of 2002, Mars Music was forced to attempt reorganization under Chapter 11 bankruptcy, and eventually filed Chapter 7 bankruptcy in November 2002.
