= Roll Me Up and Smoke Me When I Die: Musings from the Road =

Book by Willie Nelson

Roll Me Up and Smoke Me When I Die
- Author: Willie Nelson
- Illustrator: Micah Nelson
- Language: English
- Subject: Autobiography
- Publisher: William Morrow; HarperCollins
- Publication date: November 13, 2012
- Publication place: United States
- Media type: Hardcover, paperback
- Pages: 175 pages (hardcover)
- ISBN: 978-0062193643
- Preceded by: A Tale Out of Luck
- Followed by: It's a Long Story: My Life

Roll Me Up and Smoke Me When I Die: Musings from the Road is a memoir written by the American country music singer-songwriter Willie Nelson, published by HarperCollins. The book received positive reviews, and became quickly a New York Times Best Seller upon its release.

== Content ==
The book is a diary and memoir containing reminiscences and family recollections of country music singer-songwriter Willie Nelson, published by HarperCollins in November 2012 following the release of the similarly titled song. It also contains rare family pictures and other artwork made by Micah Nelson, Willie Nelson's son. It is a follow-up to two other books of similar nature: The Tao of Willie: A Guide to the Happiness in Your Heart and The Facts of Life: And Other Dirty Jokes. The book was a hit in the USA quickly reaching top 10 on New York Times Best Sellers List. The foreword was written by Kinky Friedman and the book contains illustrations by Nelson's son Micah Nelson.

== Reviews ==
The Telegraph attributed the success of the book to be the "charming and rambling voice of one of the great modern musicians of America". The review rated the book with four stars out of five. The Boston Globe delivered a favorable review. According to the publication, the inclusion of Nelson's family and friends added to the book "texture and context".

Publishers Weekly qualified the book as an "irreverent, entertaining read", while it called Nelson a "charming" narrator. Houston Press wrote a positive review, also praising the participation of Nelson's family and close collaborators on the book.
