= Guys Choice =

Awards show

The Guys Choice (formerly known as Spike Guys Choice Awards) was an awards show produced by the Viacom cable channel Spike from 2007 to 2016. The winners were originally chosen based on voting by the channel's fans and viewers until 2015, when the show started presenting the honorees.

The trophy for the award was a golden pair of antlers on a wooden pedestal, symbolizing the stag.

== Categories ==
Categories varied from year to year. Examples of categories awarded more than twice were "Guy of the Year", "Jean-Claude Gahd Dam", "Biggest Ass Kicker", "Decade of Hotness", "Funniest M.F.", "Guy Movie Hall of Fame", "Guy Movie of the Year", and "Most Unstoppable Jock".

Slightly different variants of the "Hottest (Insert Girl's Name)" category also tended to recur.

== 2000s ==
=== 2007 awards ===
The 2007 Guys Choice Awards were held June 9, 2007 at CBS Studio Center in Los Angeles, California while the television premiere aired June 13, 2007. It was hosted by Tracy Morgan, who wore an ankle monitor during the ceremony. The show featured performances by Carmen Electra and Tricia Helfer, ZZ Top and appearances by Will Ferrell and Adam Sandler, who won the Guy's Guy award, voted for by Spike viewers. Jon Favreau and Vince Vaughn were also present to accept the Guy Movie Hall of Fame Award for their cult bachelor movie Swingers.

Minka Kelly was reported in Men's Fitness magazine to have been excited when she won her award, declaring "Anyone can win an Emmy, but not everyone can say they've won an award from the network responsible for Ultimate Fighter 5 and Late Night Strip."

- Guy Movie Hall of Fame: Swingers
- Biggest Ass Kicker: Gerard Butler in 300 (winner) vs Kiefer Sutherland in 24
- Ballsiest Band: Lamb of God vs Disturbed (winner)
- Hottest Girl on the Planet: Beyoncé vs Adriana Lima (winner)
- Luckiest Bastard: Cash Warren (in recognition of his relationship with Jessica Alba) (winner) vs Dominic Monaghan (in recognition of his relationship with Evangeline Lilly)
- Funniest M.F.: Will Ferrell (winner) vs Sacha Baron Cohen
- Gift from the Gods: Minka Kelly (Friday Night Lights) (winner) vs Rashida Jones (The Office)
- Most Unstoppable Jock: Kobe Bryant vs LaDainian Tomlinson (winner)
- Naughtiest Cybervixen: Christine Dolce
- Most Dangerous Man: Chuck Liddell (winner) vs Dog the Bounty Hunter
- Femme Fatale: Tricia Helfer (Battlestar Galactica) vs Rose McGowan (Grindhouse) (winner)
- Kingpin (Guy of the Year): James Gandolfini (winner) vs George Clooney
- Cockiest Crew: Entourage Crew vs Jackass 2 Crew (winner)
- Gutsiest Move: Stephen Colbert (in recognition of his hosting of the 2006 White House Correspondents' Dinner) (winner) vs Chris Petersen (Boise State Head Coach)
- Sickest Rhymes: Jay-Z (winner) vs Nas
- Sexiest Import: Bar Refaeli
- Coolest Geek: Rainn Wilson (The Office) vs Masi Oka (Heroes) (winner)
- Best Gangstertainment: The Departed (winner) vs The Sopranos
- Hottest "Jessica": Jessica Alba (winner) vs Jessica Biel
- Chairman of the Board: Shaun White
- Game with the Most Game: Madden NFL 07
- Most Viral Video: Will Ferrell The Landlord
- Guys Guy: Adam Sandler

=== 2008 awards ===
The 2008 Guys Choice Awards were held May 31, 2008 at Sony Pictures Studios in Los Angeles. Hosted by stars John Cho and Kal Penn, the show was aired on Sunday, June 22.

- Guy of the Year: Harrison Ford vs Matt Damon (winner)
- Alpha Male Award: Hugh Hefner
- Brass Balls: Harrison Ford
- Biggest Ass Kicker: Jason Bourne (winner) vs Iron Man
- Hottest Girl on the Planet: Scarlett Johansson vs Jessica Biel (winner)
- Guy Movie of the Year: Iron Man
- Guy Movie Hall of Fame: There's Something About Mary
- Most Dangerous Man: Anderson Silva (winner) vs Wladimir Klitschko
- Decade of Hotness: Cameron Diaz
- Funniest M.F.: Steve Carell
- Hottest "Eva": Eva Longoria vs Eva Mendes (winner)
- Most Unstoppable Jock: Eli Manning (winner) vs Tiger Woods
- Sexiest Siren: Rihanna (winner) vs Avril Lavigne
- Ballsiest Band: Foo Fighters vs Linkin Park (winner)
- Sickest Rhymes: 50 Cent vs Kanye West (winner)
- Next Big Thing: Megan Fox
- Hot N' Fresh: Meagan Good vs Marisa Miller (winner)
- King of Comedy: Seth Rogen vs Chris Rock (winner)
- Play of the Year: Matt Holliday vs David Tyree (winner)
- Top Fantasy Leaguer: LeBron James (winner) vs Tom Brady
- So Hot They're Famous: Kim Kardashian vs Tila Tequila (winner)
- Femme Fatale: Jessica Simpson (winner) vs Ashley Dupré
- Badass DNA: Eli Manning and Peyton Manning (winner) vs Kurt Busch and Kyle Busch
- Hot & Funny: Tina Fey vs Sarah Silverman (winner)
- Real Sports Miracle: Richard Zedník vs Kevin Everett (winner)
- Most Viral Video: I'm Fucking Matt Damon vs I'm Fucking Ben Affleck (winner)
- Hilarious Dot Com Award: Funny or Die (winner) vs South Park Studios
- Top Literary Achievement: Slash, Slash (winner) vs Nikki Sixx, The Heroin Diaries
- Fiercest Female: Milla Jovovich (Resident Evil: Extinction) (winner) vs Summer Glau (Terminator: The Sarah Connor Chronicles)
- Luckiest Bastard: Brian Austin Green (For being engaged to Megan Fox) (winner) vs Rhys Ifans (For spooning Sienna Miller)
- Killer Quote: "Don't Taze Me, Bro" (winner) vs "I Have A Wide Stance"
- Foxiest Presidential Groupie: Obama Girl vs Hillary Hottie (winner)

=== 2009 awards ===
Event was held at Sony Pictures Studios on May 30, 2009 and aired June 21, 2009.

- Guy Movie Hall of Fame: Fight Club
- Biggest Ass Kicker: Daniel Craig vs Jason Statham (winner)
- Hottest "Mila": Mila Kunis (winner) vs Mila Jovovich
- Funniest M.F.: Sacha Baron Cohen
- Hot 'n' Fresh: Malin Åkerman (winner) vs Olivia Wilde
- Outstanding Literary Achievement: Russell Brand, My Booky Wook (winner) vs Denis Leary, Why We Suck: A Feel Good Guide to Staying Fat, Loud, Lazy and Stupid
- Mankind Award: Judd Apatow
- Guy of the Year: Barack Obama vs Mickey Rourke (winner)
- Guitar God Award: Eddie Van Halen
- Decade of Hotness: Halle Berry
- Ballsiest Band: Metallica (winner) vs Green Day
- Top Fantasy Leaguer: Drew Brees vs Dwyane Wade (winner)
- Brass Balls: Clint Eastwood
- Most Manticipated Movie: Inglourious Basterds
- Deadliest Warrior: Christian Bale as Batman (winner) vs Christian Bale as John Connor
- Most Dangerous Man: Manny Pacquiao vs Brock Lesnar (winner)
- Hottest Girl on the Planet: Bar Rafaeli vs Megan Fox (winner)
- Hottest Twins: Ikki Twins (winner) vs The Bella Twins
- Sickest Rhymes: T.I. (winner) vs Lil Wayne
- Best Bush: Will Ferrell (winner) vs Josh Brolin
- Siren: Beyoncé vs Katy Perry (winner)
- Comedy Savant: Jason Segel (winner) vs Danny McBride
- Most Unstoppable Jock: Ben Roethlisberger vs LeBron James (winner)
- Femme Fatale: Angelina Jolie (Wanted) (winner) vs Charlize Theron (Hancock)
- Best Unsupported Role: Kate Winslet (The Reader) (winner) vs Marisa Tomei (The Wrestler)
- Sexiest Athlete: Biba Golic (winner) vs Allison Stokke
- Play of the Year: Santonio Holmes' winning catch
- Porn Again: Jesse Jane
- Big Men on Campus: Florida Gators

== 2010s ==
=== 2010 awards ===
Event was held at Sony Pictures Studios on June 5, 2010 and aired June 20, 2010.

- Guycon: Sylvester Stallone
- Unstoppable Jock: Drew Brees vs LeBron James
- Holy Grail of Hot: Zoe Saldaña vs Jessica Biel
- Guy Movie of the Year: The Hangover
- Outstanding Literary Achievement: Ozzy Osbourne, I Am Ozzy vs Tracy Morgan, "I Am The New Black"
- Decade of Hotness: Charlize Theron
- Most Dangerous Man: Manny Pacquiao vs Georges St-Pierre
- Most Manticipated Movie: Inception
- Hotter Than Hell: Miranda Kerr vs Brooklyn Decker
- Guy Movie Hall of Fame: Goodfellas
- Jean-Claude Gahd Dam: Scarlett Johansson vs Zoe Saldaña
- Troops Choice for Entertainer of the Year: Sandra Bullock
- Funniest M.F.: Chris Rock
- Biggest Ass Kicker: Jack Bauer vs Perseus
- Chairman of the Board: Shaun White
- Deadliest Warrior: Robert Downey Jr. as Iron Man vs Robert Downey Jr. as Sherlock Holmes
- Guy of the Year: George Clooney vs Zach Galifianakis
- Top Fantasy Leaguer: Kevin Durant vs Chris Johnson
- Hottest "Olivia": Olivia Wilde vs Olivia Munn
- Hotshot: Danica Patrick vs Lindsey Vonn
- Comedy MVP: Ed Helms vs Tracy Morgan
- Hot and Funny: Kaley Cuoco vs Sofía Vergara
- Ballsiest Band: Stone Temple Pilots

=== 2011 awards ===
Event was held at Sony Pictures Studios on June 4, 2011 and aired June 10, 2011.

- Funniest M.F.: Jim Carrey
- Decade of Hotness: Jennifer Aniston
- Brass Balls: Keith Richards
- Guy Movie Hall of Fame: Fast Times at Ridgemont High
- Holy Grail of Hot: Minka Kelly vs Mila Kunis
- Guy of the Year: Mark Zuckerberg vs Mark Wahlberg
- Biggest Ass Kicker: Dwayne Johnson vs Mark Wahlberg
- Most Manticipated Movie: Cowboys & Aliens
- Guy Movie of the Year: The Fighter
- Troops Choice for Entertainer of the Year: Ben Affleck
- Most Dangerous Man: Manny Pacquiao vs Jon Jones
- Unstoppable Jock: Aaron Rodgers vs Kobe Bryant
- Our New Girlfriend: Rosie Huntington-Whiteley vs Candice Swanepoel
- Top Fantasy Leaguer: Arian Foster vs Chris Paul
- Comedy MVP: Daniel Tosh vs Danny McBride
- Hot and Funny: Sofía Vergara vs Emma Stone
- Outstanding Literary Achievement: Life by Keith Richards vs A Shore Thing by Nicole "Snooki" Polizzi
- Rookie of the Year: Sam Bradford vs Blake Griffin
- Best Girl On Girl Scene: Natalie Portman and Mila Kunis – Black Swan Lesbian Scene vs Minka Kelly and Leighton Meester – The Roommate Girl Fight
- "Manvention" of the Year: Christopher Sun (3D Sex and Zen: Extreme Ecstasy)

=== 2012 awards ===
Event was held at Sony Pictures Studios on June 19, 2012 and aired June 19, 2012. Foxy Shazam served as the house band for the event.

- Guy Movie Hall of Fame: Old School
- Most Manticipated Movie: The Dark Knight Rises
- Troops Choice for Entertainer of the Year: Justin Timberlake
- Funniest M.F.: Seth MacFarlane
- Guycon: Matthew McConaughey
- Choice Baller: Kobe Bryant
- Guys Man: Eric LeGrand
- Brass Balls: Adam Sandler
- Biggest Ass Kicker: Ryan Gosling vs Liam Neeson
- Most Dangerous Man: Floyd Mayweather Jr. vs Manny Pacquiao
- Holy Grail of Hot: Scarlett Johansson vs Sofía Vergara
- Unstoppable Jock: Eli Manning
- Our New Girlfriend: Kate Upton vs Doutzen Kroes
- Guy of the Year: Brad Pitt vs Louis C.K.
- Top Fantasy Leaguer: Albert Pujols vs Aaron Rodgers
- Comedy MVP: Louis C.K. vs Will Ferrell
- Hot and Funny: Emma Stone vs Kristen Wiig
- Outstanding Literary Achievement: Tina Fey, Bossypants vs Dick Cheney, In My Time: A Personal and Political Memoir
- Jean-Claude Gahd Dam: Kate Beckinsale vs Rooney Mara
- Rookie of the Year: Cam Newton vs Kyrie Irving
- Hottest "Zo(o)e(y)": Zooey Deschanel vs Zoe Saldaña
- Best Fight Scene: Mark Wahlberg (Contraband) vs Mark Wahlberg (Ted)

=== 2013 awards ===
Event was held at Sony Pictures Studios on June 8, 2013, and aired on June 12, 2013. The house band for the 2013 show is The Heavy.

- Guy of the Year: Ben Affleck
- Most Manticipated Movie: Man of Steel
- Funniest M.F.: Jimmy Kimmel
- Guycon: Vince Vaughn
- Stand-Up of the Year: Kevin Hart
- Mankind Award: Felix Baumgartner
- The Original Dude: Jeff Bridges
- Virtuoso: Jamie Foxx
- Troops Choice for Entertainment of the Year: Vin Diesel
- Hot and Funny: Kaley Cuoco
- Alpha Male: Burt Reynolds
- Rookie of the Year: Andrew Luck
- Guy Movie of the Year: Ted
- Our New Girlfriend: Katherine Webb vs Chrissy Teigen
- Outstanding Literary Achievement: Willie Nelson, "Roll Me Up and Smoke Me When I Die: Musings from the Road" vs Jeff Bridges and Bernie Glassman, The Dude and the Zen Master
- Most Dangerous Man: Walter White vs Rick Grimes
- Hottest "A(l)lison": Alison Brie vs Allison Williams
- Brotherly Love: The Dixon Brothers (Daryl and Merle) vs The Harbaugh Brothers (Jim and John)
- Jean-Claude Gahd Dam: Ronda Rousey vs Danai Gurira
- Best Lincoln: Abraham Lincoln vs Abraham Lincoln the Vampire Hunter
- Woman of the Year: Jennifer Lawrence

=== 2014 awards ===
The 2014 event was once again held at the Sony Pictures Studios in Culver City, California on June 7 and aired on Spike on June 11. Raphael Saadiq served as the musical performer.

- Guy of the Year: Matthew McConaughey
- Hottest Couple: Key & Peele
- Biggest Ass Kicker: Norman Reedus
- Guycon: Johnny Knoxville
- Holy Grail of Hot: Chrissy Teigen, Nina Agdal and Lily Aldridge
- Smartacus: Chris Hardwick
- Our New Girlfriend: Emily Ratajkowski
- Primetime: Andy Samberg
- King of Comedy: Kevin Hart
- Troops Choice for Entertainer of the Year: Mark Wahlberg
- Decade of Hotness: Sandra Bullock
- Rookie of the Year: Eddie Lacy vs Matt Harvey
- Jean-Claud Gahd Dam: Eva Green vs Lauren Cohan
- Outstanding Literary Achievement: Nick Offerman, "Paddle Your Own Canoe: One Man's Fundamentals for Delicious Living" vs Grumpy Cat, "Grumpy Cat: A Grumpy Book"
- Brotherly Love: The Robertsons (Phil, Si and Willie) vs The Wahlbergs (Mark, Donnie and Paul)
- Most Dangerous Man: Daryl Dixon vs Raymond "Red" Reddington
- Hottest Emma: Emma Watson vs Emma Stone
- Most Desirable Woman: Rihanna

=== 2015 awards ===
The 2015 event aired on June 18 at 9/8c on Spike with Terrence Howard and Taraji P. Henson hosting the event, making it the first time since 2008 the show included a host. PPL MVR served as the house band. The show was taped on June 6, 2015 at the Sony Pictures Studios in Culver City, California and aired on Spike on June 18 at 9/8c. Unlike the previous awards, the 2015 event presented the honorees.

- Guy of the Year: Chris Pratt
- Jean-Claude Ghad Dam: Taraji P. Henson
- Biggest Ass Kicker: Liam Neeson
- Top Fantasy Leaguer: Russell Westbrook
- Our New Girlfriend: Hannah Davis
- G.O.A.T: LL Cool J
- Hero: Dwayne Johnson
- Decade of Hotness: Salma Hayek
- Brass Balls: Sir Ben Kingsley
- The Best Ever: Floyd Mayweather Jr.
- Guycon: Jake Gyllenhaal
- Funniest M.F.: Chelsea Handler
- Most Dangerous Man: Terrence Howard
