= Pretty Paper (novel) =

2016 Christmas novel by Willie Nelson and David Ritz

- Author: Willie Nelson, David Ritz
- Language: English
- Subject: Novel
- Publisher: Blue Rider Press
- Publication date: October 25, 2016
- Publication place: United States
- Media type: Print (Hardcover, Paperback)
- Pages: 304 pages (hardcover)
- ISBN: 978-0-7352-1154-4
- Preceded by: It's a Long Story: My Life

Pretty Paper is a Christmas novel co-written by Willie Nelson and David Ritz. The book presents a fictional account about the life of the street vendor who inspired the song of the same name.

== Overview ==
In 1963, Nelson wrote the song "Pretty Paper", inspired by a street vendor he often saw in Fort Worth, Texas during the Christmas season that sold pencils on the door of a department store. The song was later made famous by Roy Orbison, while Nelson recorded his own version in 1979.

Published on October 25, 2016, by Blue Rider Press, the book was co-authored by David Ritz. In the fictional account, Nelson decides to learn more about the man, who he learns to be a fellow musician. The man by the name of Vernon Clay initially resists his inquiries, eventually later showing Nelson his proficiency on the guitar and singing.
