= The Facts of Life: And Other Dirty Jokes =

Book by Willie Nelson

- Author: Willie Nelson
- Language: English
- Subject: Autobiography
- Publisher: Random House
- Publication date: April 4, 2003
- Publication place: United States
- Media type: Print (Hardcover, Paperback)
- Pages: 248 pages
- ISBN: 978-0375758607
- Preceded by: Willie: An Autobiography
- Followed by: Farm Aid: A Song for America

The Facts of Life: And Other Dirty Jokes is a memoir written by American country music singer-songwriter Willie Nelson, published by Random House.

== Content ==
Co-written by Nelson and Larry McMurtry, the book was published by Random House on April 8, 2003. The publication consists in biographical material from Nelson, not ordered chronologically, with a series of anecdotes of his early life and life as a musician. The material is complemented by the addition of lyrics, pictures from Nelson's youth and the inclusion of jokes.

== Reception ==
Publishers Weekly delivered a favorable review, commenting on its Non sequitur-style "Fans and readers with ADD will love it". Austin Chronicle opined "There's not much in the author's way with a phrase, but this is still a fun, quick read". Entertainment Weekly rated the book "B−", describing Nelson's writing as sometimes "loose to the point of laziness".
