= Willie: An Autobiography =

Book by Willie Nelson

- Author: Willie Nelson, Bud Shrake
- Language: English
- Subject: Autobiography
- Publisher: Simon & Schuster
- Publication date: 1988
- Publication place: United States
- Media type: Print (Hardcover, Paperback)
- Pages: 334 pages (hardcover)
- ISBN: 978-0671680756
- Followed by: The Facts of Life: And Other Dirty Jokes

Willie: An Autobiography is an autobiographic book, written by American country music singer-songwriter Willie Nelson with the assistance of writer Bud Shrake. Published by Simon & Schuster in 1988, the book received favorable reviews.

== Content ==
The book details American singer-songwriter Willie Nelson's life, starting with his upbringing in Abbott, Texas, followed by his start as a musician and his progression on the business from a becoming a famed songwriter to his transition to stardom.

Initially titled I Didn't Come Here and I Ain't Leaving: The Autobiography of Willie Nelson, the book was co-written with author Bud Shrake and it was published by Simon & Schuster in 1988. During the time of its release, on an interview with The Philadelphia Inquirer Nelson admitted that he regretted the inclusion of the anecdote of smoking marijuana on the rooftop of the White House with a member of the Carter administration that he refused to name. He expressed that he did not regret the action, but that he did not want to include it in the autobiography. Nelson declared "it was a dumb thing to do, first of all, and a dumber thing to let get into the book. It wasn't something I was proud of."

== Reception ==
Los Angeles Times delivered a good review, calling it a "testament" to "(Nelson's) candor". The Chicago Tribune felt that the detailed accounts by Nelson, and his interviewed entourage created an autobiography that "truly illuminates its author". The New York Times concluded that Nelson "knows how to tell a good story [...] and to his credit he does not hesitate to tell a few that place him in a less than favorable light. He emerges as both self-aware and self-effacing, confident in his own talent and smarts, but modest about flaunting them".
