= Rock on Request =

American online music magazine

- Website type: Music webzine
- Owner: Lycos, Inc.
- Creator: Christina Avina
- Website: www.rockonrequest.com/
- Launched: May 20, 2007; 19 years ago
- Current status: Offline

Rock on Request was an American daily Internet publication owned by Lycos devoted to music criticism and commentary, music news, and artist interviews. Its focus was on rock music. The webzine was created in Holly Springs, North Carolina on May 20, 2007 by the music journalist Christina Avina, which had previously worked for Associated Content.

The webzine featured the latest news, interviews, record reviews, live shows, as well competitions. It held a yearly awards called the Rock on Request Awards, which were disestablished in 2010. The webzine later established a Battle of the Bands.
