= Some Kind of Monster (song) =

Single by Metallica

from the album St. Anger
- B-side: "The Four Horsemen" (Live)
- Released: July 13, 2004
- Studio: Metallica's HQ (San Rafael, California)
- Genre: Alternative metal
- Length: 8:25 (album version); 4:16 (radio edit)
- Label: Elektra
- Songwriters: James Hetfield; Lars Ulrich; Kirk Hammett; Bob Rock
- Producers: Bob Rock; Metallica

Metallica singles chronology
"The Unnamed Feeling" (2004)	"Some Kind of Monster" (2004)	"The Day That Never Comes" (2008)

Music video
- "Some Kind of Monster" on YouTube

Professional ratings
Review scores
Source	Rating
AllMusic	2/5 stars

"Some Kind of Monster" is a song by American heavy metal band Metallica from their eighth studio album, St. Anger (2003). The song was released as a single on July 13, 2004. "Some Kind of Monster" was Nominated for Grammy Award for Best Hard Rock Performance in 2005 but lost to Velvet Revolver for the song "Slither".

The Metallica documentary of the same name – Metallica: Some Kind of Monster – was released in 2004, and the single appeared in several developing forms on the film's soundtrack, along with other songs.

== Music video ==
The music video for the song was directed by Alan Smithee and filmed during the recording of the St. Anger album in San Rafael, California. It premiered on June 28, 2004.

== Track listing for soundtrack ==
All live tracks recorded live on June 11, 2003, in Paris, France.

No.	Title	Writer(s)	Length
1.	"Some Kind of Monster"	James Hetfield, Lars Ulrich, Kirk Hammett, Bob Rock	8:27
2.	"The Four Horsemen" (Live)	Hetfield, Ulrich, Dave Mustaine	5:21
3.	"Damage Inc." (Live)	Hetfield, Ulrich, Cliff Burton, Hammett	5:00
4.	"Leper Messiah" (Live)	Hetfield, Ulrich	5:56
5.	"Motorbreath" (Live)	Hetfield	3:20
6.	"Ride the Lightning" (Live)	Hetfield, Ulrich, Burton, Mustaine	6:41
7.	"Hit the Lights" (Live)	Hetfield, Ulrich	4:14
8.	"Some Kind of Monster" (Edit)	Hetfield, Ulrich, Hammett, Rock	4:16

== Personnel ==
Metallica

- James Hetfield – vocals, guitar
- Lars Ulrich – drums
- Kirk Hammett – guitar
- Robert Trujillo – bass (tracks 2–7)

Additional musicians

- Bob Rock – bass (tracks 1 & 8)

Production, tracks 1 and 8

- Produced by Bob Rock and Metallica
- Engineered and mixed by Bob Rock, assisted by Mike Gillies and Eric Helmkamp
- Digital engineering by Mike Gillies
- Mastered by Vlado Meller
- Track 8 remixed by Randy Staub and Bob Rock, remastered by Ted Jensen

Production, tracks 2-7

- Recorded and mixed by Mike Gillies
- Mastered by George Marino

Packaging

- Illustration by Matt Mahurin
- Design by Kathleen Philpott

== Charts ==
Chart (2004)	Position
Billboard 200	37
Top Canadian Albums	8
Top Soundtracks	4
