= St. Anger (song) =

2003 single by Metallica

Single by Metallica

from the album St. Anger
- B-side: "We're a Happy Family"
- Released: June 23, 2003
- Recorded: 2002–2003
- Studio: Metallica's HQ, San Rafael, California
- Genre: Alternative metal
- Length: 7:21 (album version); 5:41 (radio edit)
- Label: Elektra; Vertigo
- Songwriters: James Hetfield; Lars Ulrich; Kirk Hammett; Bob Rock
- Producers: Bob Rock; Metallica

Metallica singles chronology
"I Disappear" (2000)	"St. Anger" (2003)	"Frantic" (2003)

Music video
- "St. Anger" on YouTube

"St. Anger" is a song by American heavy metal band Metallica. It was released on June 23, 2003, as the lead single from their eighth studio album of the same name. It won Best Metal Performance at the 46th Grammy Awards and was also nominated for Best Rock Video at the 2003 MTV Video Music Awards, but lost to "Somewhere I Belong" by Linkin Park.

This song provided the theme for WWE's SummerSlam 2003; the music video was also included in the pay-per-view DVD.

The lyric "Fuck it all and fuckin' no regrets, I hit the lights on these dark sets" may be a reference to two other Metallica songs, "Damage, Inc." (Master of Puppets) and "Hit the Lights" (Kill 'Em All).

== Music video ==
The "St. Anger" video, directed by The Malloys, was shot in San Quentin State Prison, California in May 2003 and premiered on May 27, 2003.

The band played at various locations in the area to hundreds of enthusiastic inmates, except for the death chambers and the death row cells. It is also the first Metallica video to feature bassist Robert Trujillo, who joined just prior to filming.

The video begins with Metallica drummer Lars Ulrich starting the beat saying "En, to, tre, fire!" (taken from the live in studio performance of "The Unnamed Feeling") which translated from Danish means "One, two, three, four!" At the end of the video, a sentence appears on a black background, reading: "For all the souls impacted by San Quentin, your spirit will forever be a part of Metallica."

It won a 2003 Metal Edge Readers' Choice Award for Video of the Year.

== Track listing ==
International Single Part 1
No.	Title	Length
1.	"St. Anger"	7:21
2.	"Commando" (Ramones cover)	1:48
3.	"Today Your Love, Tomorrow the World" (Ramones cover)	2:13

International Single Part 2
No.	Title	Length
1.	"St. Anger"	7:21
2.	"Now I Wanna Sniff Some Glue" (Ramones cover)	1:40
3.	"Cretin Hop" (Ramones cover)	1:56

International 7" Vinyl Single
No.	Title	Length
1.	"St. Anger"	7:21
2.	"We're a Happy Family" (Ramones cover)	2:20

Japanese EP
No.	Title	Length
1.	"St. Anger"	7:21
2.	"Commando" (Ramones cover)	1:48
3.	"Today Your Love, Tomorrow the World" (Ramones cover)	2:13
4.	"Now I Wanna Sniff Some Glue" (Ramones cover)	1:40
5.	"We're a Happy Family" (Ramones cover)	2:20

== Chart positions ==
Chart (2003)	Peak position
Australia (ARIA)	15
Austria (Ö3 Austria Top 40)	17
Belgium (Ultratop 50 Flanders)	43
Canada (Nielsen SoundScan)	24
Chile (Notimex)	3
Croatia (HRT)	7
Denmark (Tracklisten)	4
Finland (Suomen virallinen lista)	5
Germany (GfK)	15
Hungary (Single Top 40)	5
Ireland (IRMA)	12
Netherlands (Dutch Top 40)	22
New Zealand (Recorded Music NZ)	38
Norway (VG-lista)	6
Paraguay (Notimex)	1
Spain (Promusicae)	4
Sweden (Sverigetopplistan)	9
Switzerland (Schweizer Hitparade)	28
UK Singles (Official Charts)	9
US Bubbling Under Hot 100 (Billboard)	7
US Alternative Airplay (Billboard)	17
US Mainstream Rock (Billboard)	2
US Active Rock (Billboard)	1
US Heritage Rock (Billboard)	5

== Certifications ==
Certifications for "St. Anger"
Region	Certification	Certified units/sales
Australia (ARIA)	Platinum	70,000^{‡}
^{‡} Sales+streaming figures based on certification alone.
