= Summer Sanitarium Tour =

Series of two concert tours by Metallica

- Tour by Metallica
- Location: North America
- Start date: June 23, 2000
- End date: August 10, 2003
- Legs: 2
- No. of shows: 41
- Box office: $90.8 million ($159 million in 2025 dollars)

Metallica concert chronology
- M2K Tour (1999–2000); Summer Sanitarium Tour (2000; 2003); Madly in Anger with the World Tour (2003–2004)

The Summer Sanitarium Tour was a concert tour by the American heavy metal band Metallica. The first edition took place during the summer of 2000, with 20 shows in the United States. A second edition was held during the summer of 2003, with 21 shows in North America. The tour was sponsored by MTV and Mars Music and promoted by SFX Concerts.

== Background ==
It marks the final tour for bassist Jason Newsted, who quit the band in January 2001. Before the concert in Atlanta on July 7, 2000, frontman James Hetfield injured his back in a jet skiing accident and was forced to sit out three shows. Newsted sang most of the songs during these concerts, and the vocals and rhythm guitar were also taken by musicians from the supporting acts, such as Kid Rock and his guitarists Kenny Olson and Jason Krause, Serj Tankian and Daron Malakian of System of a Down, and Jonathan Davis of Korn.

The tour grossed $42 million in 2000 and $48.8 million in 2003.

== Support acts ==
2000

- Korn
- Kid Rock
- Powerman 5000
- System of a Down
- Karma to Burn

2003

- Limp Bizkit
- Linkin Park
- Deftones
- Mudvayne

== Setlist ==
The following setlist was obtained from the concert held on July 12, 2000; at the Mile High Stadium in Denver, Colorado.

1. "Creeping Death"
2. "For Whom the Bell Tolls"
3. "Seek & Destroy"
4. "Fade to Black"
5. "Fuel"
6. "Whiplash"
7. "Sad but True"
8. "No Leaf Clover"
9. "King Nothing"
10. "Master of Puppets" / "Welcome Home (Sanitarium)"
11. "Battery"

Encore

12. "Nothing Else Matters"
13. "One"
14. "Turn the Page"
15. "Enter Sandman"

== Tour dates ==
List of 2000 concerts
Date	City	Country	Venue
June 23, 2000^{[A]}	Seattle	United States	Memorial Stadium
June 30, 2000	Foxborough	United States	Foxboro Stadium
July 1, 2000	Rockingham	United States	Rockingham Dragway
July 3, 2000	Madison	United States	Gateway International Raceway
July 4, 2000	Baltimore	United States	PSINet Stadium
July 7, 2000	Atlanta	United States	Georgia Dome
July 8, 2000	Sparta	United States	Kentucky Speedway
July 9, 2000	Irving	United States	Texas Stadium
July 12, 2000	Denver	United States	Mile High Stadium
July 14, 2000	San Francisco	United States	3Com Park
July 15, 2000	Los Angeles	United States	Los Angeles Memorial Coliseum
July 16, 2000	Phoenix	United States	Blockbuster Desert Sky Pavilion
July 18, 2000^{[B]}	West Hollywood	United States	House of Blues
July 20, 2000^{[C]}	East Rutherford	United States	Giants Stadium
July 22, 2000^{[D]}	Cicero	United States	Chicago Motor Speedway
August 2, 2000	Dallas	United States	Smirnoff Music Center
August 3, 2000	Dallas	United States	Smirnoff Music Center
August 5, 2000	Atlanta	United States	Lakewood Amphitheatre
August 6, 2000	Atlanta	United States	Lakewood Amphitheatre
August 8, 2000	Lexington	United States	Rupp Arena
August 9, 2000	Lexington	United States	Rupp Arena

List of 2003 concerts
Date	City	Country	Venue
July 4, 2003	Pontiac	United States	Pontiac Silverdome
July 5, 2003	Toronto	Canada	SkyDome
July 6, 2003	Foxborough	United States	Gillette Stadium
July 8, 2003	East Rutherford	United States	Giants Stadium
July 11, 2003	Atlanta	United States	Turner Field
July 12, 2003	Philadelphia	United States	Veterans Stadium
July 13, 2003	Orlando	United States	Florida Citrus Bowl
July 18, 2003	Landover	United States	FedExField
July 19, 2003	Columbus	United States	Ohio Stadium
July 20, 2003	Montreal	Canada	Parc Jean-Drapeau
July 25, 2003	St. Louis	United States	Edward Jones Dome
July 26, 2003	Stickney	United States	Hawthorne Race Course
July 27, 2003	Minneapolis	United States	Hubert H. Humphrey Metrodome
August 1, 2003	Denver	United States	Invesco Field at Mile High
August 2, 2003	Houston	United States	Reliant Stadium
August 3, 2003	Irving	United States	Texas Stadium
August 6, 2003	West Valley City	United States	USANA Amphitheatre
August 7, 2003	Seattle	United States	Seahawk Stadium
August 9, 2003	Los Angeles	United States	Los Angeles Memorial Coliseum
August 10, 2003	San Francisco	United States	3Com Park

Festivals and other miscellaneous performances
^{A} This concert is a part of the "Experience Music Project Opening Celebration"
^{B} This concert is a part of the "MGD Blind Date"
^{C} This concert is a part of "Tattoo the Earth"
^{D} This concert is a part of "Rockfest"

=== Box office score data ===
Venue	City	Tickets sold / Available	Gross revenue
Foxboro Stadium	Foxborough	49,551 / 49,551 (100%)	$3,173,885
Rockingham Speedway	Rockingham	24,646 / 35,000 (70%)	$1,479,335
Gateway International Raceway	Madison	31,840 / 40,000 (80%)	$1,923,415
PSINet Stadium	Baltimore	39,257 / 50,000 (78%)	$3,415,205
Georgia Dome	Atlanta	44,023 / 46,202 (95%)	$2,803,840
Kentucky Speedway	Sparta	50,462 / 60,000 (84%)	$3,280,030
Texas Stadium	Irving	49,429 / 49,429 (100%)	$3,160,170
Mile High Stadium	Denver	38,643 / 48,000 (80%)	$2,445,950
3Com Park	San Francisco	91,643 / 115,007 (80%)	$6,037,030
Los Angeles Memorial Coliseum	Los Angeles	131,231 / 153,200 (87%)	$8,490,755
Pontiac Silverdome	Pontiac	35,021 / 59,545 (59%)	$2,521,275
SkyDome	Toronto	36,562 / 37,447 (98%)	$2,341,286
Gillette Stadium	Foxborough	42,898 / 48,600 (88%)	$3,116,300
Giants Stadium	East Rutherford	51,934 / 56,600 (92%)	$3,500,780
Turner Field	Atlanta	22,957 / 50,043 (46%)	$1,667,295
Florida Citrus Bowl	Orlando	26,982 / 27,000 (~100%)	$2,023,650
FedExField	Landover	27,656 / 58,377 (47%)	$1,943,100
Ohio Stadium	Columbus	41,458 / 50,000 (83%)	$2,850,885
Parc Jean-Drapeau	Montreal	41,738 / 42,000 (99%)	$2,523,110
Hawthorne Race Course	Stickney	36,614 / 36,614 (100%)	$2,746,050
Hubert H. Humphrey Metrodome	Minneapolis	35,979 / 35,979 (100%)	$2,803,740
Seahawk Stadium	Seattle	28,882 / 37,283 (77%)	$2,116,150
TOTAL		979,406 / 1,185,877 (83%)	$66,363,236
