= The Unnamed Feeling =

2004 single by Metallica

Single by Metallica

from the album St. Anger
- Released: January 12, 2004
- Genre: Nu metal
- Length: 7:08 (album version); 5:32 (radio edit)
- Label: Elektra
- Songwriters: James Hetfield; Lars Ulrich; Kirk Hammett; Bob Rock
- Producers: Bob Rock; Metallica

Metallica singles chronology
"Frantic" (2003)	"The Unnamed Feeling" (2004)	"Some Kind of Monster" (2004)

Music video
- "The Unnamed Feeling" on YouTube

"The Unnamed Feeling" is a song by heavy metal band Metallica. It was released on January 12, 2004, as the third single from the band's eighth studio album, St. Anger (2003). The song is about an unnamed feeling (which, according to James Hetfield, is anxiety) that a person feels when they are close to losing control, just before they panic.

Along with a music video, the song was released as a single exclusively to Australia. It was released as part of an E.P. in the UK. The unique video, directed by The Malloys, featured the band performing in a virtually empty room that gradually closed in on them throughout the song. This was accompanied by visual stories of several people all experiencing that "unnamed feeling" in their own way.

The front cover of the basic singles depicts the "monster" from other St. Anger singles. However, cover art for the Australia-exclusive CD single for "The Unnamed Feeling" was chosen by Metallica through a contest where Australian fans could submit their own original artwork. The winning piece by Louis Claveria depicts an isolated illustration of a black heart roughly outlined in white with a black background. Claveria's artwork was autographed by the band and framed, and all four finalists were featured in an exclusive poster insert included in the single. Exclusive live B-sides from Metallica's first show at the Big Day Out festival in Gold Coast were featured on the Australian single.

== Music video ==
The music video directed by The Malloys and filmed in October 2003 in Los Angeles and premiered on December 3, 2003.

== Track listing ==
International EP
No.	Title	Writer(s)	Length
1.	"The Unnamed Feeling"	James Hetfield; Lars Ulrich; Kirk Hammett; Bob Rock	7:10
2.	"The Four Horsemen" (Live at Le Bataclan, Paris, 2003)	Hetfield; Ulrich; Dave Mustaine	5:30
3.	"Damage, Inc." (Live at Le Bataclan, Paris, 2003)	Hetfield; Ulrich; Cliff Burton; Hammett	4:59
4.	"Leper Messiah" (Live at Le Bataclan, Paris, 2003)	Hetfield; Ulrich	6:24
5.	"Motorbreath" (Live at Le Boule Noire, Paris, 2003)	Hetfield	3:13
6.	"Ride the Lightning" (Live at Le Bataclan, Paris, 2003)	Hetfield; Ulrich; Burton; Mustaine	7:31
7.	"Hit the Lights" (Live at Trabendo, Paris, 2003)	Hetfield; Ulrich	4:10
8.	"The Unnamed Feeling" (CDROM Video)	Hetfield; Ulrich; Hammett; Rock

International Single Part 1
No.	Title	Writer(s)	Length
1.	"The Unnamed Feeling"	Hetfield; Ulrich; Hammett; Rock	7:10
2.	"The Four Horsemen" (Live at Le Bataclan, Paris, 2003)	Hetfield; Ulrich; Mustaine	5:31
3.	"Damage, Inc." (Live at Le Bataclan, Paris, 2003)	Hetfield; Ulrich; Burton; Hammett	5:00
4.	"The Unnamed Feeling" (CDROM Video)	Hetfield; Ulrich; Hammett; Rock

International Single Part 2
No.	Title	Writer(s)	Length
1.	"The Unnamed Feeling"	Hetfield; Ulrich; Hammett; Rock	7:10
2.	"Hit the Lights" (Live at Le Trabendo, Paris, 2003)	Hetfield; Ulrich	4:10
3.	"Ride the Lightning" (Live at Le Bataclan, Paris, 2003)	Hetfield; Ulrich; Burton; Mustaine	7:31
4.	"Motorbreath" (Live at Boule Noire, Paris, 2003)	Hetfield	3:13

International 7" Picture Disc
No.	Title	Writer(s)	Length
1.	"The Unnamed Feeling"	Hetfield; Ulrich; Hammett; Rock	7:10
2.	"Leper Messiah" (Live)	Hetfield; Ulrich	6:24

Cardsleeve single
No.	Title	Writer(s)	Length
1.	"The Unnamed Feeling"	Hetfield; Ulrich; Hammett; Rock	7:09
2.	"Frantic" (UNKLE Reconstruction - Artificial Confidence)	Hetfield; Ulrich; Hammett; Rock	6:48

Australian single
No.	Title	Writer(s)	Length
1.	"The Unnamed Feeling"	Hetfield; Ulrich; Hammett; Rock	7:11
2.	"Dirty Window" (Live at the Big Day Out, Gold Coast, 2004)	Hetfield; Ulrich; Hammett; Rock	5:31
3.	"Master of Puppets" (Live at the Big Day Out, Gold Coast, 2004)	Hetfield; Ulrich; Burton; Hammett	8:32
4.	"Battery" (Live at the Big Day Out, Gold Coast, 2004)	Hetfield; Ulrich	5:42

== Charts ==
Chart (2003–2004)	Peak position
Australia (ARIA)	23
Austria (Ö3 Austria Top 40)	42
Belgium (Ultratip Bubbling Under Flanders)	11
Denmark (Tracklisten)	3
Finland (Suomen virallinen lista)	2
France (SNEP)	60
Germany (GfK)	24
Hungary (Single Top 40)	1
Italy (FIMI)	10
Netherlands (Single Top 100)	20
Norway (VG-lista)	10
Spain (Promusicae)	1
Sweden (Sverigetopplistan)	37
Switzerland (Schweizer Hitparade)	47
UK Singles (Official Charts)	42
US Mainstream Rock (Billboard)	28
