= Frantic (Metallica song) =

2003 single by Metallica

Single by Metallica

from the album St. Anger
- B-side: "Blackened" (live)
- Released: September 15, 2003
- Recorded: 2002–2003
- Studio: Metallica's HQ (San Rafael, California)
- Genre: Alternative metal
- Length: 5:51 (album version); 4:58 (radio edit)
- Label: Elektra; Vertigo
- Songwriters: James Hetfield; Lars Ulrich; Kirk Hammett; Bob Rock
- Producers: Bob Rock; Metallica

Metallica singles chronology
"St. Anger" (2003)	"Frantic" (2003)	"The Unnamed Feeling" (2004)

Music video
- "Frantic" on YouTube

Professional ratings
Review scores
Source	Rating
AllMusic	3.5/5 stars

"Frantic" is the second single and opening track from American heavy metal band Metallica's eighth album St. Anger (2003).

== Content ==
This song, like many others on St. Anger, is about the band's past struggles with addictions, particularly lead singer James Hetfield's alcohol problem, for which he spent many months in rehab. The lyrics also draw on Zen axioms, most notably the Buddhist concept of dukkha brought up by Kirk Hammett: "Birth is pain. Life is pain. Death is pain. It's All The Same."

== Music video ==
A music video, directed by Wayne Isham, was made to go along with "Frantic"'s release as a single. It was filmed in July 2003 in Montreal and premiered in August 15, 2003.

The video, featuring a shortened version of the song, depicts a man looking back on his life (in which he is constantly drinking, having sex, and smoking) at the instant that he crashes his rotisserie delivery pickup truck into an RV at an intersection. Intercut with those clips are scenes of the band performing the song in front of a pile of scrap metal (Hetfield and Hammett) and a set of rocks (Ulrich and Trujillo). At the end of the video, although the man's truck is upside-down, he finds himself still alive and laughs loudly until a car crashes into the side of the truck, tipping it over and presumably killing him. The video was shot in Montreal, Canada.

== Track listing ==
International Single Part 1

1. "Frantic" - 5:50
2. "Blackened (Live - Download Festival)" - 6:37
3. "Harvester of Sorrow (Live - Download Festival)" - 6:41
4. "Frantic (Video)"
- Live tracks recorded on June 1, 2003, at the Download Festival, Donington, UK

International Single Part 2

1. "Frantic" - 5:50
2. "No Remorse (Live - Download Festival)" - 5:16
3. "Welcome Home (Sanitarium) (Live - Download Festival)" - 6:40
- Live tracks recorded on June 1, 2003, at the Download Festival, Donington, UK

International 2-track Single

1. "Frantic" - 5:50
2. "No Remorse (Live - Download Festival)" - 5:16
- Live tracks recorded on June 1, 2003, at the Download Festival, Donington, UK

Belgian Single

1. "Frantic" - 5:53
2. "Harvester of Sorrow (Live - Fields of Rock Festival)" - 6:46
3. "Welcome Home (Sanitarium) (Live - Werchter Festival)" - 6:41
4. "No Remorse (Live - Werchter Festival)" - 5:52
- "Harvester of Sorrow" recorded live on June 15, 2003, at the Fields of Rock Festival, Nijmegen, Netherlands
- "Welcome Home (Sanitarium)" and "No Remorse" recorded live on June 28, 2003, at the Werchter Festival, Werchter, Belgium

Spanish Single

1. "Frantic" - 5:53
2. "Harvester of Sorrow (Live - Doctor Music Festival)" - 6:51
3. "Welcome Home (Sanitarium) (Live - Doctor Music Festival)" - 6:41
4. "No Remorse (Live - Doctor Music Festival)" - 5:37
- Live tracks recorded on June 21, 2003, at the Doctor Music Festival, Barcelona, Spain

Italian Single

1. "Frantic" - 5:50
2. "Blackened (Live - Imola Jammin' Festival)" - 7:02
3. "Harvester of Sorrow (Live - Imola Jammin' Festival)" - 6:33
4. "Welcome Home (Sanitarium) (Live - Imola Jammin' Festival)" - 7:18
5. "No Remorse (Live - Imola Jammin' Festival)" - 5:29
- Live tracks recorded on June 13, 2003, at the Imola Jammin' Festival, Imola, Italy

Danish Single

1. "Frantic" - 5:50
2. "Blackened (Live - Roskilde Festival)" - 8:02
3. "Harvester of Sorrow (Live - Roskilde Festival)" - 7:06
4. "Welcome Home (Sanitarium) (Live - Roskilde Festival)" - 6:49
5. "No Remorse (Live - Roskilde Festival) - 5:33
- Live tracks recorded on June 26, 2003, at the Roskilde Festival, Roskilde, Denmark

German Single

1. "Frantic" - 5:50
2. "Harvester of Sorrow (Live - Rock Am Ring)" - 6:49
3. "Welcome Home (Sanitarium) (Live - Rock Am Ring) - 6:58
- Live tracks recorded on June 8, 2003, at the Rock Am Ring Festival, Nurburgring, Germany

French Single

1. "Frantic" - 5:53
2. "Blackened (Live - Le Trabendo)" - 5:58
3. "Harvester of Sorrow (Live - La Boule Noire)" - 7:05
4. "Welcome Home (Saniatrium) (Live - La Boule Noire)" - 6:44
- Recorded live on June 11, 2003, at Le Trabendo & La Boule Noire, Paris, France (Metallica played 3 gigs in Paris on that same day to celebrate the release of the St. Anger album)

Japanese EP

1. "Frantic" - 5:50
2. "Blackened (Live - Download Festival)" - 6:37
3. "Harvester of Sorrow (Live - Download Festival)" - 6:41
4. "Welcome Home (Sanitarium) (Live - Download Festival)" - 6:40
5. "No Remorse (Live - Download Festival)" - 5:16
- Live tracks recorded on June 1, 2003, at the Download Festival, Donington, UK

International Vinyl Single

1. "Frantic" - 5:50
2. "Frantic (UNKLE Reconstruction - Artificial Confidence)" - 6:51

== Chart positions ==
Chart (2003–04)	Peak position
Australia (ARIA)	22
Austria (Ö3 Austria Top 40)	30
Belgium (Ultratip Bubbling Under Flanders)	6
Croatia (HRT)	7
Denmark (Tracklisten)	6
Finland (Suomen virallinen lista)	4
France (SNEP)	59
Germany (GfK)	21
Hungary (Single Top 40)	2
Ireland (IRMA)	20
Italy (FIMI)	24
Netherlands (Dutch Top 40)	32
Netherlands (Single Top 100)	22
New Zealand (Recorded Music NZ)	23
Norway (VG-lista)	5
Scottish Singles Sales (Official Charts)	17
Spain (Promusicae)	2
Sweden (Sverigetopplistan)	13
Switzerland (Schweizer Hitparade)	57
UK Singles (Official Charts)	16
UK Rock & Metal (Official Charts)	4
US Mainstream Rock (Billboard)	21
