= List of songs in Guitar Hero: Metallica =

Guitar Hero: Metallica is the third spinoff title of the Guitar Hero video game series. The game focuses on the band Metallica, the second title in the series to focus on a specific band after the series' previous Guitar Hero: Aerosmith. The full setlist for the game for all platforms contains 49 songs, 28 from the band, and 21 others from bands that are "their personal favorites and influences from over the years". The PlayStation 2 and Wii versions of the game include three tracks from Death Magnetic, which was otherwise available as downloadable content for PlayStation 3 and Xbox 360 users. The whole Death Magnetic album was later released on Wii as Guitar Hero 5 downloadable content in November 2009.

Guitar Hero: Metallica features a "full band" mode similar to Guitar Hero World Tour that allows for up to four players to play lead guitar, bass guitar, drums, and vocals. Players can play alone or with others both locally and online in competitive and cooperative game modes. In any mode, players attempt to match notes on instrument controllers as indicated by scrolling notes on-screen in order to score points and prevent the song from ending in failure. To match notes, lead and bass guitar players hold down fret buttons while strumming on the controller, drum players strike the matching drum pads on the drum controller, and vocalists attempt to match pitch with the song. Songs can be played in a Career mode in both single player and band modes to work through the song list below, or players may play any song using the game's Quickplay feature.

The setlist has been well received by critics, stating that the setlist reads like "the quintessential 'Best Of' track list for the band". Matt Helgeson of Game Informer reviewed the soundtrack as "the best hit to miss ratio of any music game to date".

The recordings from Death Magnetic used in Guitar Hero: Metallica are notable for being far less compressed than the CD versions.

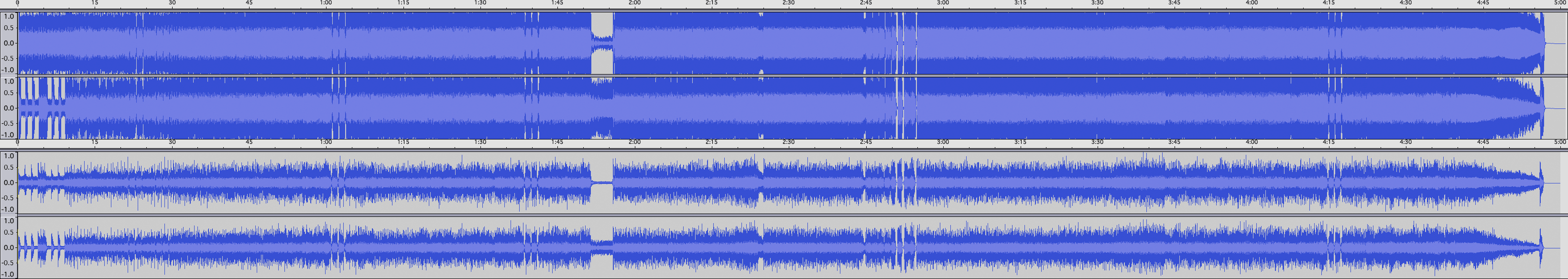
As this waveform for "My Apocalypse" shows, the Guitar Hero downloadable version (bottom) is far less compressed than the CD release of Death Magnetic (top).

== Main setlist ==
The following list is the complete setlist of songs featured in the game, including the year of release of the song according to the game, the song name, the artist, and the song's placement in the band Career mode. All songs are based on master recordings, in two cases, specifically re-recorded for the game. In the game's Career mode, songs are presented sequentially in tiers representing both real and fictional venues. To access each subsequent tier, the players must accumulate a number of stars from available songs; completing a song rewards the players with up to five stars based on their overall performance. Tiers are arranged in approximate difficulty, which varies between the single player instrument careers and the band career modes, with later tiers representing more difficult songs. Thirty-nine of the songs are exportable into Guitar Hero 5, Band Hero and Guitar Hero: Warriors of Rock for a small fee.

Year	Song title	Artist	Band Career Tier/Venue	Exportable
2008	"Ace of Spades"^{[C]}	Motörhead	5. Damaged Justice Tour	Yes
1994	"Albatross"	Corrosion of Conformity	4. Hammersmith Apollo	No
2008	"All Nightmare Long"^{+}	Metallica	5. Damaged Justice Tour	No^{[D]}
1982	"Am I Evil?"	Diamond Head	6. The Meadowlands	Yes
1980	"Armed and Ready"^{+}	Michael Schenker Group	4. Hammersmith Apollo	No
1986	"Battery"^{+}	Metallica	6. The Meadowlands	Yes
2007	"Beautiful Mourning"^{+}	Machine Head	7. Donington Park	Yes
2008	"The Black River"	The Sword	5. Damaged Justice Tour	Yes
2004	"Blood and Thunder"^{+}	Mastodon	6. The Meadowlands	Yes
1976	"The Boys Are Back in Town"	Thin Lizzy	4. Hammersmith Apollo	Yes
2008	"Broken, Beat & Scarred"^{+}^{[A]}	Metallica	9. The Stone Nightclub	No^{[D]}
1984	"Creeping Death"^{+}	Metallica	6. The Meadowlands	Yes
2008	"Cyanide"^{+}^{[A]}	Metallica	9. The Stone Nightclub	No^{[D]}
1994	"Demon Cleaner"	Kyuss	2. Tushino Air Field	Yes
1986	"Disposable Heroes"^{+}	Metallica	7. Donington Park	Yes
1988	"Dyers Eve"^{+}	Metallica	7. Donington Park	Yes
1991	"Enter Sandman"	Metallica	3. Metallica at Tushino	Yes
2008	"Evil"^{[C]}^{+}	Mercyful Fate	7. Donington Park	Yes
1984	"Fade to Black"^{+}	Metallica	4. Hammersmith Apollo	Yes
1984	"Fight Fire With Fire"^{+}	Metallica	7. Donington Park	Yes
1984	"For Whom the Bell Tolls"	Metallica	1. The Forum	Yes
2003	"Frantic"	Metallica	5. Damaged Justice Tour	Yes
1997	"Fuel"^{+}	Metallica	5. Damaged Justice Tour	Yes
1978	"Hell Bent for Leather"^{+}	Judas Priest	5. Damaged Justice Tour	No
1983	"Hit the Lights"	Metallica	5. Damaged Justice Tour	Yes
1996	"King Nothing"	Metallica	3. Metallica at Tushino	Yes
1986	"Master of Puppets"^{+}	Metallica	6. The Meadowlands	Yes
1997	"The Memory Remains"	Metallica	4. Hammersmith Apollo	Yes
1998	"Mercyful Fate"	Metallica	6. The Meadowlands	Yes
1998	"Mommy's Little Monster" (Live)	Social Distortion	5. Damaged Justice Tour	Yes
1986	"Mother of Mercy"	Samhain	2. Tushino Air Field	Yes
2008	"My Apocalypse"^{+}^{[A]}	Metallica	9. The Stone Nightclub	No^{[D]}
1994	"No Excuses"^{[B]}	Alice in Chains	2. Tushino Air Field	No
1999	"No Leaf Clover"	Metallica	3. Metallica at Tushino	Yes
1991	"Nothing Else Matters"	Metallica	3. Metallica at Tushino	Yes
1988	"One"^{+}	Metallica	5. Damaged Justice Tour	Yes
1986	"Orion"^{[E]}^{+}	Metallica	4. Hammersmith Apollo	Yes
1991	"Sad but True"^{[B]}	Metallica	3. Metallica at Tushino	Yes
1983	"Seek & Destroy"^{[B]}	Metallica	6. The Meadowlands	Yes
1988	"The Shortest Straw"^{+}	Metallica	7. Donington Park	Yes
1999	"Stacked Actors"	Foo Fighters	4. Hammersmith Apollo	No
1974	"Stone Cold Crazy"^{[B]}	Queen	6. The Meadowlands	No
1986	"The Thing That Should Not Be"	Metallica	8. The Ice Cave	Yes
2001	"Toxicity"	System of a Down	4. Hammersmith Apollo	No
1973	"Tuesday's Gone"	Lynyrd Skynyrd	2. Tushino Air Field	Yes
1976	"Turn the Page" (Live)	Bob Seger and the Silver Bullet Band	2. Tushino Air Field	Yes
1991	"The Unforgiven"	Metallica	1. The Forum	Yes
1990	"War Ensemble"^{+}	Slayer	7. Donington Park	No
1990	"War Inside My Head"	Suicidal Tendencies	5. Damaged Justice Tour	No
1986	"Welcome Home (Sanitarium)"^{+}	Metallica	4. Hammersmith Apollo	Yes
1991	"Wherever I May Roam"^{+}	Metallica	4. Hammersmith Apollo	Yes
1983	"Whiplash"^{+}	Metallica	7. Donington Park	Yes

^{A} These songs are exclusive to PlayStation 2 and Wii game disks. Available as downloadable content on Xbox 360 and PlayStation 3
^{B} These songs are included on the game's demo on the Xbox 360
^{C} These songs were re-recorded by the original artist for use in the game
^{D} Not available as part of the Guitar Hero: Metallica export package but is available as downloadable content for the Guitar Hero series (compatible with Guitar Hero III, Guitar Hero World Tour, Guitar Hero 5, Band Hero and Guitar Hero: Warriors of Rock)
^{E} Song does not contain Vocal section
^+ Song contains both a single and double bass drums chart

== Downloadable content ==
Although no new downloadable content was released for the game, PlayStation 3 or Xbox 360 players who purchased playable tracks from Metallica's Death Magnetic album for Guitar Hero World Tour and Guitar Hero III: Legends of Rock through either the PlayStation Store or Xbox Live Marketplace had these tracks incorporated into Guitar Hero: Metallica, with the exclusion of "All Nightmare Long" which can be played after completing 5 of the 9 tiers. These tracks become available in Career mode after completing the credits stage, "The Ice Cave." These songs are played in "The Stone Nightclub" venue. The game supports new song creation and sharing through the "GHTunes" music service (for PlayStation 3, Wii and Xbox 360 only) common to both World Tour and Metallica.
