= List of songs in Guitar Hero III: Legends of Rock =

Guitar Hero III: Legends of Rock is the third release in the Guitar Hero series of music video games. This game is the first in the series to be developed by Neversoft, and was distributed by RedOctane and Activision. The game was released on the PlayStation 2, PlayStation 3, Wii, and Xbox 360 game consoles, and also for Microsoft Windows and Apple Macintosh personal computers.

Guitar Hero III features 73 songs on the game's media; this includes the 39 single-player songs, three "Boss Battle" songs, six co-op career exclusive songs, and 25 bonus songs. The Xbox 360 and PlayStation 3 versions support downloadable content in the form of new songs for the game. As of September 12, 2008, there are 59 songs available as downloadable content for both platforms, bringing the total number of available songs for these versions to 132. Four downloadable songs were only available for a limited time. The Xbox 360 and PlayStation 3 versions each had an exclusive song.

== Game disc songs ==
=== Main setlist ===
Guitar Hero III features 73 songs spread across both the Solo and Co-Op Career modes. These songs are arranged in eight sequential tiers based on their relative difficulty. The player(s) must complete some or all of the songs in one tier (based on the career difficulty selected), including the Encore, to access the next one. During the Solo Career mode, the player will also encounter three Boss Battles, a new mode introduced in Guitar Hero III, at the ends of three tiers as listed below, prior to performing the Encore song. The player must attempt the Boss Battle three times, but after the third time the player has the option of passing the Boss Battle in order to continue progression in the game. However, this option is only available for the first two boss battles (Slash and Tom Morello). In Co-Op Career mode, the players only perform the first six tiers, do not encounter any Boss Battles, and have different Encore songs from the Solo Career mode.

Once a tier is open at any difficulty level, all songs except the Encores and Boss Battle songs become available for all other game modes; the Encore songs become available once they are completed. The three Boss Battle songs are not playable outside of Solo Career mode. However, these songs were available as free downloadable content for the Xbox 360 and PlayStation 3 versions of the game. All songs (except Boss Battles) can be unlocked for all modes through special cheat codes for the game, as to, for example, allow a solo player to access the Co-Op Encore songs without having to play through Co-Op mode.

Being based on the same engine as the seventh generation versions of Guitar Hero III, Guitar Hero Arcade features a set of 50 songs chosen from the main, bonus and downloadable content lists.

Year	Song title	Artist	Genre	Master recording?	Solo tier	Co-op tier
2007	"3's & 7's"	Queens of the Stone Age	Hard Rock	Yes^{j}	7. Live in Japan	5. Jailhouse Rock
2007	"Anarchy in the U.K."^{d}	Sex Pistols	Punk	Yes^{a}^{e}	4. European Invasion	3. Over Night Success
1977	"Barracuda"^{d}	Heart	Classic Rock	No^{g}	2. Your First Real Gig	1. Getting a Band Together
2004	"Before I Forget"	Slipknot	Alternative Metal	Yes	7. Live in Japan	–
1970	"Black Magic Woman"^{d}	Santana	Blues Rock	No^{h}	6. Hottest Band on Earth	4. Getting the Band Back Together
1992	"Black Sunshine"^{d}	White Zombie	Groove Metal	No^{f}	6. Hottest Band on Earth	5. Jailhouse Rock
1996	"Bulls on Parade"^{d}	Rage Against the Machine	Rap Rock	Yes	2. Your First Real Gig; Encore	1. Getting a Band Together
1993	"Cherub Rock"^{d}	The Smashing Pumpkins	Alternative Rock	Yes	6. Hottest Band on Earth	4. Getting the Band Back Together
1972	"Cities on Flame with Rock and Roll"^{d}	Blue Öyster Cult	Classic Rock	No^{g}	–	4. Getting the Band Back Together; Encore
1990	"Cliffs of Dover"^{d}	Eric Johnson	Rock	No^{f}	8. Battle for Your Soul	–
2007	"Cult of Personality"^{d}^{e}	Living Colour	Hard Rock	Yes^{a}	7. Live in Japan; Encore	6. Battle for Your Souls
2007	"The Devil Went Down to Georgia"	Steve Ouimette (Inspired by The Charlie Daniels Band)	Southern Rock	Yes	8. Battle for Your Soul; Boss Battle	–
1991	"Even Flow"	Pearl Jam	Grunge	Yes	4. European Invasion; Encore	–
2007	"Guitar Battle vs. Slash"	Slash	Rock	Yes	5. Big House Blues; Boss Battle	–
2007	"Guitar Battle vs. Tom Morello"	Tom Morello	Rock	Yes	2. Your First Real Gig; Boss Battle	–
2004	"Helicopter"^{b}^{d}	Bloc Party	Indie Rock	Yes	–	5. Jailhouse Rock; Encore
1980	"Hit Me with Your Best Shot"^{d}	Pat Benatar	Classic Rock	No^{g}	1. Starting Out Small	–
1980	"Holiday in Cambodia"^{d}	Dead Kennedys	Hardcore Punk	No^{f}	5. Big House Blues	4. Getting the Band Back Together
2006	"Knights of Cydonia"^{d}	Muse	Alternative Rock	Yes	7. Live in Japan	6. Battle for Your Souls
1990	"Kool Thing"	Sonic Youth	Alternative Rock	Yes	4. European Invasion	2. We Just Wanna Be Famous
1973	"La Grange"^{d}	ZZ Top	Blues Rock	No^{h}	5. Big House Blues	–
2006	"Lay Down"^{d}	Priestess	Hard Rock	Yes	3. Making the Video	3. Over Night Success
2006	"The Metal"^{d}	Tenacious D	Hard Rock	Yes	6. Hottest Band on Earth	5. Jailhouse Rock
2006	"Miss Murder"	AFI	Alternative	Yes	3. Making the Video	2. We Just Wanna Be Famous
1970	"Mississippi Queen"^{d}	Mountain	Hard Rock	No^{g}	2. Your First Real Gig	–
2006	"Monsters"^{d}	Matchbook Romance	Alternative	Yes	–	6. Battle for Your Souls; Encore
1994	"My Name Is Jonas"	Weezer	Alternative	Yes	4. European Invasion	5. Jailhouse Rock
1982	"The Number of the Beast"	Iron Maiden	Heavy Metal	Yes	8. Battle for Your Soul	6. Battle for Your Souls
1988	"One"^{b}	Metallica	Thrash Metal	Yes	8. Battle for Your Soul	6. Battle for Your Souls
1966	"Paint It Black"^{d}^{i}	The Rolling Stones	Classic Rock	Yes	3. Making the Video; Encore	–
1970	"Paranoid"^{d}	Black Sabbath	Heavy Metal	No^{h}	4. European Invasion	3. Over Night Success
1983	"Pride and Joy"^{d}	Stevie Ray Vaughan	Blues Rock	No^{h}	6. Hottest Band on Earth; Encore	–
1986	"Raining Blood"	Slayer	Thrash Metal	Yes	8. Battle for Your Soul	–
2003	"Reptilia"^{d}	The Strokes	Indie Rock	Yes	–	2. We Just Wanna Be Famous; Encore
1975	"Rock and Roll All Nite"^{d}	Kiss	Classic Rock	No^{h}	1. Starting Out Small; Encore	–
1984	"Rock You Like a Hurricane"^{d}	Scorpions	Glam Metal	No^{g}	5. Big House Blues	–
1994	"Sabotage"^{d}	Beastie Boys	Rap Rock	Yes	–	1. Getting a Band Together; Encore
1974	"Same Old Song and Dance"^{b}^{d}	Aerosmith	Hard Rock	Yes^{k}	5. Big House Blues	4. Getting the Band Back Together
1972	"School's Out"^{d}	Alice Cooper	Glam Rock	No^{g}	2. Your First Real Gig	2. We Just Wanna Be Famous
1970	"The Seeker"	The Who	Classic Rock	No^{h}	3. Making the Video	2. We Just Wanna Be Famous
1975	"Slow Ride"^{d}	Foghat	Classic Rock	No^{f}	1. Starting Out Small	1. Getting a Band Together
1990	"Story of My Life"	Social Distortion	Punk	No^{f}	1. Starting Out Small	–
2005	"Stricken"^{d}	Disturbed	Alternative Metal	Yes	7. Live in Japan	–
1991	"Suck My Kiss"	Red Hot Chili Peppers	Alternative	Yes	–	3. Over Night Success; Encore
1968	"Sunshine of Your Love"^{d}	Cream	Blues Rock	No^{h}	2. Your First Real Gig	–
1987	"Talk Dirty to Me"^{d}	Poison	Glam Metal	No^{g}	1. Starting Out Small	–
1987	"Welcome to the Jungle"	Guns N' Roses	Hard Rock	Yes	5. Big House Blues; Encore	3. Over Night Success
2006	"When You Were Young"	The Killers	Alternative	Yes	3. Making the Video	1. Getting a Band Together

=== Bonus songs ===
Unlike the previous two games, whose bonus acts mostly comprised bands from the Boston scene (some of which have had members who worked at Harmonix and were involved with the games' development), Guitar Hero III's bonus song selection showcases a variety of European bands in addition to American bands signed to independent labels. All but one of the bonus songs are purchased in the in-game store using the virtual money earned through the Career modes of the game. The exception, "Through the Fire and Flames" by DragonForce, is unlocked after the player completes the solo Career mode on any difficulty, and can be played during the credits, though is not required (but the player cannot exit during the sequence). The song cannot be failed while being played during the credits.

Year	Song title	Artist	Genre	Master recording?
1995	"Avalancha"^{c}^{d}	Héroes del Silencio	Hard Rock	Yes
2006	"Can't Be Saved"	Senses Fail	Emo	Yes
2006	"Closer"^{d}	Lacuna Coil	Alternative Metal	Yes
2006	"Don't Hold Back"^{d}	The Sleeping	Alternative	Yes
2007	"Down 'n Dirty"	L.A. Slum Lords	Punk	Yes
2005	"F.C.P.R.E.M.I.X."	The Fall of Troy	Post-Hardcore	Yes
2005	"Generation Rock"	Revolverheld	Pop Rock	Yes
2006	"Go That Far"^{c}	Bret Michaels Band	Hard Rock	Yes
1988	"Hier kommt Alex"	Die Toten Hosen	Punk Rock	Yes
2005	"I'm in the Band"	Hellacopters	Hard Rock	Yes
2007	"Impulse"	An Endless Sporadic	Progressive Metal	Yes
2006	"In Love"	Scouts of St. Sebastian	Garage Rock	Yes
2006	"In the Belly of a Shark"^{d}	Gallows	Post-Hardcore	Yes
2007	"Mauvais Garçon"	Naast	Garage Rock	Yes
2007	"Metal Heavy Lady"	Lions	Hard Rock	Yes
2003	"Minus Celsius"	Backyard Babies	Hard Rock	Yes
2006	"My Curse"	Killswitch Engage	Metalcore	Yes
2007	"Nothing for Me Here"	Dope	Nu Metal	Yes
2006	"Prayer of the Refugee"	Rise Against	Melodic Hardcore	Yes
2004	"Radio Song"	Superbus	Pop Rock	Yes
2007	"Ruby"	Kaiser Chiefs	Indie Rock	Yes
1989	"She Bangs the Drums"^{d}	The Stone Roses	Alternative	No^{f}
2006	"Take This Life"^{d}	In Flames	Melodic Death Metal	Yes
2006	"The Way It Ends"	Prototype	Progressive Metal	Yes
2006	"Through the Fire and Flames"^{c}	DragonForce	Power Metal	Yes

^aThis song was re-recorded specifically for Guitar Hero III.

^bSong has a rhythm guitar track instead of a bass guitar co-operative play track.

^cSong has no rhythm guitar or bass guitar track included and, thus, cannot be played in any co-operative mode.

^dThis song is featured in the main setlist of Guitar Hero Arcade.

^eThis song was re-recorded by the original artist for the game.

^fThis song was covered by WaveGroup.

^gThis song was covered by Steve Ouimette Studios.

^hThis song was covered by Line 6.

^iThis song's Bass or Rhythm chart is hidden; it can only be accessed in Co-Op mode.

^jThis song is an unreleased version.

^kThis song was originally set to be covered by Steve Ouimette Studios before Joe Perry gave Neversoft permission to use the master recording. An early beta version of the game has the cover version's chart.

== Downloadable songs ==
Both the Xbox 360 and the PlayStation 3 version of Guitar Hero III feature the ability to download additional songs from the consoles' respective online stores; all are master recordings. Most songs must be purchased in "track packs" of three and cannot be purchased individually while only some songs are available as "singles." There are several free songs available. The downloadable songs have been released on the same day on both the Xbox Live Marketplace and the PlayStation Store, with five exceptions. Besides the two console-exclusive songs, the three songs from the Companion Pack were not released for the PlayStation 3 until August 7, 2008. The two console-exclusive songs come from console-exclusive games; the "Halo Theme" is from the Halo series and is only available for the Xbox 360 version and "The End Begins" is from the God of War series and is only available for the PlayStation 3 version.

Year	Song title	Artist	Release date	Single / Pack
2007	"Carcinogen Crush"	AFI	Oct. 31, 2007	Companion Pack
2007	"Tina"	Flyleaf	Oct. 31, 2007	Companion Pack
2007	"Putting Holes in Happiness (Nick Zinner Remix)"	Marilyn Manson	Oct. 31, 2007	Companion Pack
2002	"All My Life"	Foo Fighters	Nov. 8, 2007	Foo Fighters Pack
2007	"The Pretender"^{m}	Foo Fighters	Nov. 8, 2007	Foo Fighters Pack
1995	"This Is a Call"^{s}	Foo Fighters	Nov. 8, 2007	Foo Fighters Pack
2007	"She Builds Quick Machines"	Velvet Revolver	Nov. 8, 2007	Velvet Revolver Pack
2004	"Slither"	Velvet Revolver	Nov. 8, 2007	Velvet Revolver Pack
2007	"Messages"	Velvet Revolver	Nov. 8, 2007	Velvet Revolver Pack
2007	"Tom Morello Guitar Battle"^{m}	Tom Morello	Nov. 15, 2007	Boss Battle Pack^{q}
2007	"Slash Guitar Battle"^{m}	Slash	Nov. 15, 2007	Boss Battle Pack^{q}
2007	"The Devil Went Down to Georgia"^{m}	Steve Ouimette; Inspired by the Charlie Daniels Band	Nov. 15, 2007	Boss Battle Pack^{q}
2004	"Halo Theme MJOLNIR Mix"^{m}^{n}	O'Donnell/Salvatori/Vai	Nov. 22, 2007^{n}	Single^{q}
2007	"Ernten Was Wir Säen"	Die Fantastischen Vier	Dec. 20, 2007	Single
1996	"So Payaso"^{m}	Extremoduro	Dec. 20, 2007	Single
1980	"Antisocial"	Trust	Dec. 20, 2007	Single
2007	"We Three Kings"^{m}	Steve Ouimette	Dec. 20, 2007	Single^{q}
2007	"Pretty Handsome Awkward"^{s}	The Used	Dec. 20, 2007	Warner/Reprise Track Pack
2007	"No More Sorrow"^{s}	Linkin Park	Dec. 20, 2007	Warner/Reprise Track Pack
2006	"Sleeping Giant"^{s}	Mastodon	Dec. 20, 2007	Warner/Reprise Track Pack
1980	"Any Way You Want It"	Journey	Jan. 24, 2008	Classic Rock Track Pack
1981	"Jukebox Hero"^{s}	Foreigner	Jan. 24, 2008	Classic Rock Track Pack
1976	"Peace of Mind"^{s}	Boston	Jan. 24, 2008	Classic Rock Track Pack
1973	"Dream On"^{l}	Aerosmith	Feb. 16, 2008^{p}	Single
1996	"Excuse Me Mr."	No Doubt	Feb. 28, 2008	No Doubt Track Pack
1996	"Don't Speak"	No Doubt	Feb. 28, 2008	No Doubt Track Pack
1996	"Sunday Morning"	No Doubt	Feb. 28, 2008	No Doubt Track Pack
2007	"The Arsonist"^{s}	Thrice	Mar. 6, 2008	Modern Metal Track Pack
2006	"Hole in the Earth"^{s}	Deftones	Mar. 6, 2008	Modern Metal Track Pack
2007	"Almost Easy"^{s}	Avenged Sevenfold	Mar. 6, 2008	Modern Metal Track Pack
2007	"Famous For Nothing"	Dropkick Murphys	Mar. 13, 2008^{p}	Dropkick Murphys Track Pack^{q}
2007	"(F)lannigan's Ball"	Dropkick Murphys	Mar. 13, 2008^{p}	Dropkick Murphys Track Pack^{q}
2007	"Johnny, I Hardly Knew Ya"	Dropkick Murphys	Mar. 13, 2008^{p}	Dropkick Murphys Track Pack^{q}
2008	"Nine Lives"	Def Leppard	Apr. 24, 2008	Def Leppard Track Pack
1983	"Rock of Ages" (Live)	Def Leppard	Apr. 24, 2008	Def Leppard Track Pack
1983	"Photograph" (Live)	Def Leppard	Apr. 24, 2008	Def Leppard Track Pack
2006	"Exo-Politics"	Muse	May 8, 2008	Muse Track Pack
2006	"Supermassive Black Hole"	Muse	May 8, 2008	Muse Track Pack
2003	"Stockholm Syndrome"	Muse	May 8, 2008	Muse Track Pack
2008	"(We Are) The Road Crew"^{l}	Motörhead	June 5, 2008	Motörhead Track Pack
2008	"Stay Clean"^{l}	Motörhead	June 5, 2008	Motörhead Track Pack
2008	"Motorhead"^{l}^{s}	Motörhead	June 5, 2008	Motörhead Track Pack
2008	"The End Begins (to Rock)"	Gerard Marino	June 7, 2008^{o}	Single^{q}
2006	"Shoot the Runner"	Kasabian	June 12, 2008	Isle of Wight Festival Track Pack
2004	"I Predict a Riot"	Kaiser Chiefs	June 12, 2008	Isle of Wight Festival Track Pack
2008	"Problems" (Live at Brixton)	Sex Pistols	June 12, 2008	Isle of Wight Festival Track Pack
2008	"Violet Hill"	Coldplay	June 19, 2008	Coldplay Track Pack
2000	"Yellow"^{s}	Coldplay	June 19, 2008	Coldplay Track Pack
2002	"God Put a Smile upon Your Face"	Coldplay	June 19, 2008	Coldplay Track Pack
2008	"I Am Murloc"	L70ETC	June 26, 2008	Single^{q}
1986	"Top Gun Anthem"	Steve Ouimette ^{r}	July 3, 2008	Single^{q}
1987	"Surfing with the Alien"^{s}	Joe Satriani	July 24, 2008	Guitar Virtuoso Track Pack
1990	"For the Love of God"^{s}	Steve Vai	July 24, 2008	Guitar Virtuoso Track Pack
2006	"Soothsayer"	Buckethead	July 24, 2008	Guitar Virtuoso Track Pack
2006	"Operation Ground and Pound"^{m}	DragonForce	Aug. 21, 2008	DragonForce Track Pack
2006	"Revolution Deathsquad"^{m}	DragonForce	Aug. 21, 2008	DragonForce Track Pack
2008	"Heroes of Our Time"^{m}	DragonForce	Aug. 21, 2008	DragonForce Track Pack
2008	"That Was Just Your Life"	Metallica	Sept. 12, 2008	Death Magnetic
2008	"The End of the Line"	Metallica	Sept. 12, 2008	Death Magnetic
2008	"Broken, Beat & Scarred"	Metallica	Sept. 12, 2008	Death Magnetic
2008	"The Day That Never Comes"	Metallica	Sept. 12, 2008	Death Magnetic
2008	"All Nightmare Long"	Metallica	Sept. 12, 2008	Death Magnetic
2008	"Cyanide"	Metallica	Sept. 12, 2008	Death Magnetic
2008	"The Unforgiven III"	Metallica	Sept. 12, 2008	Death Magnetic
2008	"The Judas Kiss"	Metallica	Sept. 12, 2008	Death Magnetic
2008	"Suicide & Redemption J.H."	Metallica	Sept. 12, 2008	Death Magnetic
2008	"Suicide & Redemption K.H."	Metallica	Sept. 12, 2008	Death Magnetic
2008	"My Apocalypse"	Metallica	Sept. 12, 2008	Death Magnetic

^lThis song was re-recorded specifically for Guitar Hero III.

^mSong has a rhythm guitar track instead of a bass guitar co-operative play track.

^nThis song is exclusive to Xbox 360 users.

^oThis song is exclusive to PlayStation 3 users.

^pThis song is no longer available for download.

^qThis song is available at no cost.

^rThis song does not specify the artist in-game, however, the correct artist is noted.

^sThis song is featured in the main setlist of Guitar Hero Arcade.

== Soundtrack CD ==
Guitar Hero III: Legends of Rock Companion Pack

Soundtrack album by Various artists
- Released: October 23, 2007
- Genre: Rock
- Length: 42:10
- Label: Interscope
- Producers: Tim Riley, Steve Sherr, Tony Seyler

A special soundtrack CD titled Guitar Hero: Legends of Rock Companion Pack was released as part of the promotion for the game's release. The CD has songs that are included on the game disc, as well as two of the three songs from the "Companion Pack", and one from the Velvet Revolver pack.

A special code is packaged with the CD that allows Xbox 360 users to download the "Companion Pack" on Xbox Live Marketplace for free. The song pack was exclusive to the Xbox 360 and was only obtainable by using the code that came with the CD. On August 7, 2008, the song pack was made available to all on the Xbox Live Marketplace and PlayStation Store.

=== Track listing ===
No.	Title	Length
1.	"Guitar Hero III Intro" (Slash)	1:04
2.	"Cherub Rock" (The Smashing Pumpkins)	4:57
3.	"3's & 7's" (Queens of the Stone Age)	3:34
4.	"Miss Murder" (AFI)	3:25
5.	"Slither" (Velvet Revolver)	4:09
6.	"Kool Thing" (Sonic Youth)	4:05
7.	"Cult of Personality" (Living Colour)	4:53
8.	"Putting Holes in Happiness (Nick Zinner Remix)" (Marilyn Manson)	3:42
9.	"Tina" (Flyleaf)	2:31
10.	"Prayer of the Refugee" (Rise Against)	3:19
11.	"The Devil Went Down to Georgia (Guitar Hero Original)" (Steve Ouimette)	6:15
