= Orgullo, Pasión, y Gloria: Tres Noches en la Ciudad de México =

Video by Metallica
- Released: November 30, 2009 (Latin America only)
- Recorded: June 4, 6 and 7, 2009
- Venues: Foro Sol (Mexico City, Mexico)
- Genres: Heavy metal; thrash metal
- Label: Universal Records
- Director: Wayne Isham
- Producers: James Hetfield; Lars Ulrich

Metallica video chronology
Français Pour une Nuit (2009)	Orgullo, Pasión, y Gloria: Tres Noches en la Ciudad de México (2009)	The Big Four: Live from Sofia, Bulgaria (2010)

Metallica chronology
Death Magnetic (2008)	Orgullo, Pasión y Gloria: Tres Noches en la Ciudad de México (2009)	Six Feet Down Under (2010)

Orgullo, Pasión, y Gloria: Tres Noches en la Ciudad de México (or Orgulho, Paixão e Glória: Três Noites na Cidade do México, in the Portuguese version) (English: Pride, Passion and Glory: Three Nights in Mexico City) is a live video and album by the American heavy metal band Metallica, recorded at Foro Sol, Mexico City, Mexico, on June 4, 6 and 7, 2009, during the World Magnetic Tour. It was supposed to be released in Latin America only, but it is also available in Northern Europe. The record was released in four formats:

- A DVD containing 19 tracks
- A Blu-ray of the DVD
- A digipak with the DVD and two CDs
- A deluxe version in a slipcase with two DVDs and two CDs

It also features interviews with the band members and all the credits in Spanish (and Portuguese for Brazil). On September 22, 2010, the deluxe version was released in Japan containing the two DVDs and two SHM-CDs.

Professional ratings
Review scores
Source	Rating
Allmusic	4/5 stars

== Track listing ==
=== DVD 1 ===
- DVD, DVD/2CD, 2DVD/2CD & Blu-ray

No.	Title	Length
1.	"Opening/The Ecstasy of Gold"	3:25
2.	"Creeping Death"	6:26
3.	"For Whom the Bell Tolls"	5:30
4.	"Ride the Lightning"	6:37
5.	"Disposable Heroes"	8:30
6.	"One"	8:37
7.	"Broken, Beat & Scarred"	7:04
8.	"The Memory Remains"	5:06
9.	"Sad but True"	6:29
10.	"The Unforgiven"	6:17
11.	"All Nightmare Long"	7:49
12.	"The Day That Never Comes"	7:56
13.	"Master of Puppets"	8:09
14.	"Fight Fire with Fire"	5:06
15.	"Nothing Else Matters"	7:13
16.	"Enter Sandman"	6:44
17.	"The Wait"	4:25
18.	"Hit the Lights"	3:44
19.	"Seek & Destroy"	11:28
Total length:		2:06:35

=== DVD 2 ===
- 2DVD/2CD

No.	Title	Length
1.	"That Was Just Your Life"	7:05
2.	"The End of the Line"	7:50
3.	"Holier Than Thou"	3:56
4.	"Cyanide"	7:01
5.	"Blackened"	6:13
6.	"Helpless"	4:29
7.	"Trapped Under Ice"	4:34
8.	"Turn the Page"	5:08
9.	"The Prince"	4:39
10.	"No Remorse"	4:33
11.	"Fuel"	4:00
12.	"Wherever I May Roam"	6:53
13.	"Harvester of Sorrow"	5:52
14.	"Fade to Black"	7:26
15.	"...And Justice for All"	10:03
16.	"Dyers Eve"	4:43
Total length:		1:34:25

=== CD 1 ===
- DVD/2CD & 2DVD/2CD
1. "The Ecstasy of Gold" - 1:57
2. "Creeping Death" - 6:20
3. "For Whom the Bell Tolls" - 5:29
4. "Ride the Lightning" - 7:09
5. "Disposable Heroes" - 8:22
6. "One" - 9:05
7. "Broken, Beat & Scarred" - 6:48
8. "The Memory Remains" - 5:32
9. "Sad but True" - 7:05
10. "The Unforgiven" - 5:50

=== CD 2 ===
- DVD/2CD & 2DVD/2CD
1. "All Nightmare Long" - 8:04
2. "The Day That Never Comes" - 8:06
3. "Master of Puppets" - 8:13
4. "Fight Fire with Fire" - 6:48
5. "Nothing Else Matters" - 5:57
6. "Enter Sandman" - 8:18
7. "The Wait" - 4:16
8. "Hit the Lights" - 6:33
9. "Seek & Destroy" - 7:37

== Personnel ==
- James Hetfield - lead vocals, rhythm guitar
- Lars Ulrich - drums
- Kirk Hammett - lead guitar, backing vocals
- Robert Trujillo - bass, backing vocals

== Chart performance ==
Country	Provider(s)	Peak position	Certification	Sales/ shipments
Argentina	CAPIF	2	Platinum	40,000+
Brazil	ABPD	-	3× Platinum	90,000+
Mexico	AMPROFON	2	Platinum	60,000+
