= Français Pour une Nuit =

Français pour une nuit

Video by Metallica
- Released: November 23, 2009 (France only)
- Recorded: July 7, 2009
- Venues: Arena of Nîmes (Nîmes, France)
- Genres: Heavy metal; thrash metal
- Length: 132:01
- Label: Universal Records
- Producers: James Hetfield; Lars Ulrich

Metallica chronology
The Videos 1989–2004 (2006)	Français pour une nuit (2009)	Orgullo, Pasión, y Gloria: Tres Noches en la Ciudad de México (2009)

Français pour une nuit (English: French for One Night) is a live DVD by the American heavy metal band Metallica, recorded in Nîmes, France, in the Arena of Nîmes on July 7, 2009, during the World Magnetic Tour. It was released in three formats: A standard DVD in a digipak including a 16-page booklet, a Blu-ray, and a digipak with the booklet and a deluxe limited edition box set including the DVD, a copy of Death Magnetic on CD, a T-shirt, laminated pass, and five exclusive photos. Despite only being issued in France, it has been imported in sufficient quantity to be considered a regular release. Aside from the photography by Ross Halfin, the entire project was made by French professionals, from the video to the art direction.

== Track listing ==
1. "The Ecstasy of Gold" (Intro) – 2:40
2. "Blackened" – 5:40
3. "Creeping Death" – 6:25
4. "Fuel" – 4:33
5. "Harvester of Sorrow" – 6:07
6. "Fade to Black" – 8:40
7. "Broken, Beat & Scarred" – 6:35
8. "Cyanide" – 7:52
9. "Sad but True" – 5:43
10. "One" – 7:53
11. "All Nightmare Long" – 9:32
12. "The Day That Never Comes" – 8:30
13. "Master of Puppets" – 8:40
14. "Dyers Eve" – 6:36
15. "Nothing Else Matters" – 5:54
16. "Enter Sandman" – 9:20
17. "Stone Cold Crazy" – 2:30
18. "Motorbreath" – 5:44
19. "Seek & Destroy" – 13:07

== Personnel ==
- James Hetfield – lead vocals, rhythm guitar
- Kirk Hammett – lead guitar, backing vocals
- Robert Trujillo – bass, backing vocals
- Lars Ulrich – drums

== Charts ==
Chart (2009)	Peak position
Belgian (Flanders) Music DVDs Chart	3
Belgian (Wallonia) Music DVDs Chart	4
Finnish Music DVDs Chart	2
Swiss Music DVDs Chart	3

Chart (2010)	Peak position
Danish Music DVDs Chart	3
Dutch Music DVDs Chart	13
UK Music Videos Chart	9

== Certifications ==
Region	Certification	Certified units/sales
Australia (ARIA)	Gold	7,500^{^}
Belgium (BRMA)	Gold	25,000^{*}
France (SNEP)	3× Platinum	45,000^{*}
^{*} Sales figures based on certification alone.^{^} Shipments figures based on certification alone.
