= World Magnetic Tour =

2008–2010 concert tour by Metallica

- World tour by Metallica
- Promotional poster of one of the three shows in Mexico City
- Location: Asia; Europe; North America; Oceania; South America
- Associated album: Death Magnetic
- Start date: October 21, 2008
- End date: November 21, 2010
- Legs: 18
- No. of shows: 187
- Attendance: 2.74 million (164 shows)
- Box office: $219.9 million (164 shows)

Metallica concert chronology
- 2008 European Vacation Tour (2008); World Magnetic Tour (2008–2010); 2011 Vacation Tour (2011)

The World Magnetic Tour was a concert tour by the American heavy metal band Metallica in support of the band's ninth studio album, Death Magnetic, which was released on September 12, 2008.

The tour officially kicked off in October 2008 in Glendale, United States, following three European promotional dates in September and two U.S. rehearsal shows. By September 2010, the tour had reached North America, Europe, South America, Asia and Oceania. The tour culminated with three dates in Melbourne, Australia, in late November 2010.

== Background ==
A North American leg, their first since the Madly in Anger with the World Tour in 2004, began in Phoenix, Arizona, and wrapped up in late December in Oakland, California. The leg continued in early January 2009, starting in Milwaukee and finishing up in Newark, New Jersey, in early February.

In February 2009, the band commenced a European tour. The group played three rounds of dates, resuming in late March and then returning again in May. In between the first and second legs, the band performed a small promotional show in Austin, Texas, U.S. to support the video game release Guitar Hero: Metallica. The European legs began in Nottingham, England, and eventually culminated in Cologne, Germany.

In June 2009, the group played three dates in Mexico City. The shows reached a total capacity of 158,349 and were the band's first shows in Mexico in ten years. Later in the month, the group returned to Europe, performing a mixture of indoor and outdoor shows, and festival appearances. The leg featured headline slots at the first iterations of the Sonisphere Festival, a new festival event which took place in Finland, Germany, the Netherlands, Spain, Sweden and the UK. The leg began in Helsinki and finished in early August in Knebworth, England.

In September 2009, the band kicked off a third North American leg, beginning in Nashville, Tennessee, and finishing in mid-November in New York City. The act resumed touring duties in December, performing five dates in the Western U.S.

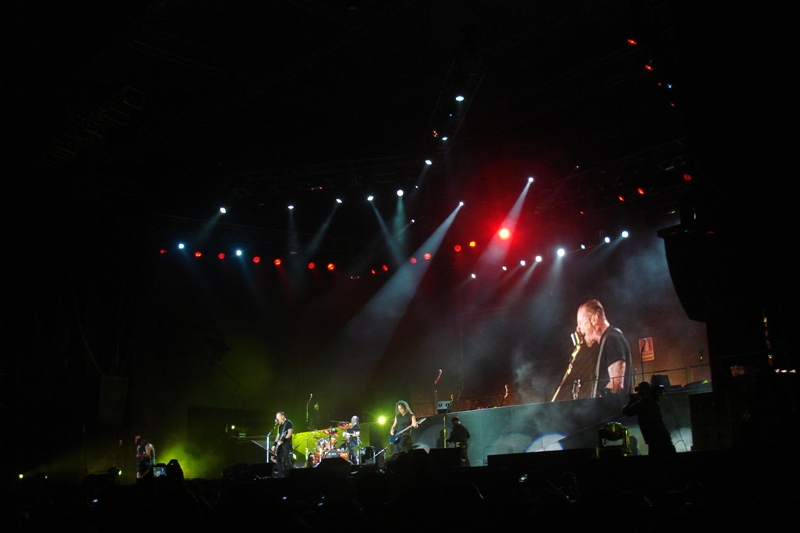
Metallica performing at Estadio San Marcos (World Magnetic Tour) in Lima, Peru

In January 2010, the band headed to South America, playing mostly outdoor shows. The leg kicked off in Lima and finished in São Paulo, Brazil. In March, the group returned to Mexico, performing in Guadalajara and Monterrey. The leg continued on with additional dates in South America, as well as shows in Central America. The band also performed for the first time in countries such as Puerto Rico, Costa Rica and Guatemala.

In April 2010, the act once again returned to Europe, beginning with two dates in Oslo. The leg included appearances at the 2010 editions of the Sonisphere Festival, which featured exclusive billings of the "Big Four" of thrash metal: Slayer, Megadeth and Anthrax, as well as Metallica. The events took place in Poland, Switzerland, Czech Republic, Bulgaria, Greece, Romania and Turkey. The band also returned to Israel in May, for the third time in their career.

In September 2010, the band kicked off one of three legs in Oceania, followed by two dates in Tokyo. In mid-October and late November 2010, the group returned for additional concerts in Oceania. The group also played a show in the United States in early November for the Call of Duty: Black Ops launch party. The entire tour culminated with three dates in Melbourne, Australia.

The dates in Mexico City were recorded and later released on CD, DVD and Blu-ray with the title, Orgullo, Pasión y Gloria ("Pride, Passion and Glory"). Additionally, the show in Nîmes, France, was filmed and subsequently released on DVD and Blu-ray entitled, Français Pour Une Nuit ("French for One Night"). Both titles were released to retail in November 2009 only in their respective markets (South America and France) and through the band's official website.

The band's performance at the Sonisphere Festival in Sofia was beamed to more than 450 movie theatres in more than 140 markets in the U.S. and select cities in Europe, Canada and South America on June 22, 2010. The live video was later released on DVD and Blu-ray in October 2010, entitled The Big 4 Live from Sofia, Bulgaria.

According to concert magazine Pollstar, the tour was the tenth highest-grossing for 2009 with revenue of US$89.1 million from 78 shows, and ranked fifth in 2010 with revenue of $110.1 million. Overall, the tour grossed $219.9 million from 164 reported shows across two years with an attendance of over 2.74 million people.

This was the first time Metallica ever played in Puerto Rico. They were originally going to play on April 28, 1993, at Hiram Bithorn Stadium on the Nowhere Else to Roam Tour, but the rains that day reached a level of over two feet, which would have been a hazardous situation if the band had played.

== Support acts ==
- Alice in Chains (Dublin)
- Avenged Sevenfold (Mexico City and Dublin)
- Baroness (October 13–23, 2010; November 10–21, 2010)
- Criminal (Santiago)
- Deep Trip (Bogotá)
- Dischord (Caracas)
- Down (October 21–November 23, 2008)
- Extinción (Guatemala City)
- Fear Factory (April 13–25, 2010; September 15–26, 2010)
- Glyder (Dublin)
- Gojira (September 14–October 18, 2009; April 13–25, 2010)
- Hibria (Porto Alegre)
- High on Fire (May 11–23, 2010)
- Horcas (Buenos Aires (January 21, 2010))
- Lamb of God (December 1–15 and 20, 2008; June 14–June 24, 2009; July 13–30, 2009; September 14–November 15, 2009; October 13–23, 2010; November 10–21, 2010)
- Un León D-mente (Buenos Aires)
- Machine Head (December 17 and 18, 2008; January 12–February 1, 2009; February 25–March 7, 2009; March 25–April 2, 2009; May 4–17, 2009; December 5–12, 2009)
- Mad (Córdoba)
- Maligno (Guadalajara and Monterrey)
- Mass Hysteria (Nîmes)
- Mastodon (June 14–June 24, 2009; July 13–August 1, 2009; March 1–14, 2010)
- M.O.P.A. (Nîmes)
- Necropsya (Lima)
- O'Connor (Buenos Aires (January 22, 2010))
- Orphaned Land (Tel Aviv)
- Pneuma (San José)
- Resorte (Mexico City)
- Sepultura (São Paulo)
- The Sword (October 21–December 20, 2008; January 12–February 1, 2009; February 25–March 7, 2009; March 25–April 2, 2009; May 4–17, 2009; September 15–26, 2010)
- Tainted (Christchurch)
- Volbeat (October 26–November 15, 2009; December 5–12, 2009; May 11–19 and 23, 2010)

== First typical setlist ==
(Taken from the Sofia, Bulgaria, Vasil Levski Stadium show on June 22, 2010)

1. "Creeping Death"
2. "For Whom the Bell Tolls"
3. "Fuel"
4. "Harvester of Sorrow"
5. "Fade to Black"
6. "That Was Just Your Life"
7. "Cyanide"
8. "Sad but True"
9. "Welcome Home (Sanitarium)"
10. "All Nightmare Long"
11. "One"
12. "Master of Puppets"
13. "Blackened"
14. "Nothing Else Matters"
15. "Enter Sandman"
16. "Am I Evil?" (originally performed by Diamond Head) (with Anthrax, Megadeth and Dave Lombardo of Slayer)
17. "Hit the Lights"
18. "Seek & Destroy"

== Second typical setlist ==
(Taken from the Christchurch, New Zealand, CBS Canterbury Arena show on September 21, 2010)

1. "That Was Just Your Life"
2. "The End of the Line"
3. "For Whom the Bell Tolls"
4. "Fuel"
5. "Fade to Black"
6. "Broken, Beat & Scarred"
7. "No Remorse"
8. "Sad but True"
9. "Welcome Home (Sanitarium)"
10. "All Nightmare Long"
11. "One"
12. "Master of Puppets"
13. "Battery"
14. "Nothing Else Matters"
15. "Enter Sandman"
16. "Stone Cold Crazy" (originally performed by Queen)
17. "Whiplash"
18. "Seek & Destroy"

== Tour dates ==
List of 2008 concerts
Date (2008)	City	Country	Venue	Attendance	Revenue
October 21	Glendale	United States	Jobing.com Arena	16,008 / 16,008	$841,979
October 23	Albuquerque	United States	Tingley Coliseum	10,946 / 10,946	$709,660
October 25	Kansas City	United States	Sprint Center	13,501 / 13,501	$854,765
October 26	Des Moines	United States	Wells Fargo Arena	8,380 / 8,380	$515,657
November 1	Portland	United States	Rose Garden Arena	12,499 / 12,499	$803,568
November 3	Salt Lake City	United States	EnergySolutions Arena	—	—
November 4	Denver	United States	Pepsi Center	—	—
November 6	Omaha	United States	Qwest Center	12,339 / 12,339	$716,650
November 8	Moline	United States	iWireless Center	10,930 / 10,930	$645,166
November 9	Columbus	United States	Jerome Schottenstein Center	16,744 / 16,744	$1,015,642
November 17	St. Louis	United States	Scottrade Center	10,901 / 10,901	$629,800
November 18	Tulsa	United States	BOK Center	14,020 / 14,020	$737,115
November 20	Houston	United States	Toyota Center	17,163 / 17,163	$1,168,463
November 22	North Little Rock	United States	Alltel Arena	11,708 / 11,708	$656,700
November 23	New Orleans	United States	New Orleans Arena	13,313 / 13,313	$757,050
December 1	Seattle	United States	KeyArena	14,714 / 14,714	$965,466
December 2	Vancouver	Canada	General Motors Place	—	—
December 4	Calgary	Canada	Pengrowth Saddledome	32,040 / 32,040	$2,033,577
December 5	Calgary	Canada	Pengrowth Saddledome	32,040 / 32,040	$2,033,577
December 7	Edmonton	Canada	Rexall Place	17,926 / 17,926	$1,107,681
December 12	Ontario	United States	Citizens Business Bank Arena	10,959 / 10,959	$774,417
December 13	Fresno	United States	Save Mart Center	13,562 / 13,562	$791,405
December 15	San Diego	United States	Cox Arena	12,906 / 12,906	$844,674
December 17	Inglewood	United States	The Forum	34,427 / 34,427	$2,234,771
December 18	Inglewood	United States	The Forum	34,427 / 34,427	$2,234,771
December 20	Oakland	United States	Oracle Arena	18,000 / 18,000	$1,275,000

List of 2009 concerts
Date (2009)	City	Country	Venue	Attendance	Revenue
January 12	Milwaukee	United States	Bradley Center	13,348 / 13,348	$794,657
January 13	Detroit	United States	Joe Louis Arena	19,588 / 19,588	$1,240,617
January 15	Washington	United States	Verizon Center	18,422 / 18,422	$1,274,265
January 17	Philadelphia	United States	Wachovia Center	19,736 / 19,736	$1,353,652
January 18	Boston	United States	TD Banknorth Garden	17,066 / 17,066	$1,144,875
January 26	Rosemont	United States	Allstate Arena	33,534 / 33,534	$2,243,799
January 27	Rosemont	United States	Allstate Arena	33,534 / 33,534	$2,243,799
January 29	Uniondale	United States	Nassau Coliseum	17,859 / 17,859	$1,152,255
January 31	Newark	United States	Prudential Center	34,374 / 34,374	$2,223,933
February 1	Newark	United States	Prudential Center	34,374 / 34,374	$2,223,933
February 25	Nottingham	England	Trent FM Arena	10,223 / 10,223	$593,004
February 26	Manchester	England	Manchester Evening News Arena	19,539 / 19,539	$1,128,049
February 28	Sheffield	England	Sheffield Arena	13,033 / 13,033	$743,428
March 2	London	England	The O_{2} Arena	16,079 / 16,079	$1,135,733
March 3	Newcastle upon Tyne	England	Metro Radio Arena	10,791 / 10,791	$611,431
March 5	Antwerp	Belgium	Sportpaleis Antwerp	17,788 / 17,788	$1,254,264
March 7	Stockholm	Sweden	Ericsson Globe	—	—
March 20	Austin	United States	Stubb's	—	—
March 25	Birmingham	England	LG Arena	12,167 / 12,167	$714,135
March 26	Glasgow	Scotland	SECC	9,935 / 9,935	$581,563
March 28	London	England	The O_{2} Arena	19,407 / 19,407	$1,150,649
March 30	Rotterdam	Netherlands	Rotterdam Ahoy	11,180 / 11,180	$912,063
April 1	Paris	France	Palais Omnisports de Paris-Bercy	—	—
April 2	Paris	France	Palais Omnisports de Paris-Bercy	—	—
May 4 ^{[2]}	Stockholm	Sweden	Ericsson Globe	16,174 / 16,174	$1,133,912
May 6	Munich	Germany	Olympiahalle	—	—
May 7	Leipzig	Germany	Arena Leipzig	—	—
May 9	Stuttgart	Germany	Hanns-Martin-Schleyer-Halle	—	—
May 11	Frankfurt	Germany	Festhalle Frankfurt	—	—
May 12	Hamburg	Germany	Color Line Arena	—	—
May 14	Vienna	Austria	Wiener Stadthalle	—	—
May 16	Oberhausen	Germany	König Pilsener Arena	—	—
May 17	Cologne	Germany	Lanxess Arena	—	—
June 4	Mexico City	Mexico	Foro Sol	156,728 / 156,728	$8,602,465
June 6	Mexico City	Mexico	Foro Sol	156,728 / 156,728	$8,602,465
June 7	Mexico City	Mexico	Foro Sol	156,728 / 156,728	$8,602,465
June 14	Helsinki	Finland	Hartwall Areena	28,163 / 28,163	$2,560,139
June 15	Helsinki	Finland	Hartwall Areena	28,163 / 28,163	$2,560,139
June 17	Oslo	Norway	Oslo Spektrum	20,280 / 20,280	$2,143,596
June 19 (Note: This performance was part of Nova Rock Festival.)	Nickelsdorf	Austria	Pannonia Fields II	—N/a	—N/a
June 20 (Note: This performance was part of Sonisphere Festival.)	Nijmegen	Netherlands	Goffertpark	—N/a	—N/a
June 22	Milan	Italy	Mediolanum Forum	—	—
June 24	Rome	Italy	PalaLottomatica	—	—
July 4 (Note: This performance was part of Sonisphere Festival.)	Hockenheim	Germany	Hockenheimring	—N/a	—N/a
July 5 (Note: This performance was part of Rock Werchter.)	Werchter	Belgium	Festival Park	—N/a	—N/a
July 7 (Note: This performance was part of Festival de Nîmes.)	Nîmes	France	Arena of Nîmes	—N/a	—N/a
July 9 (Note: This performance was part of Optimus Alive!.)	Lisbon	Portugal	Passeio Marítimo de Algés	—N/a	—N/a
July 11 (Note: This performance was part of Sonisphere Festival.)	Barcelona	Spain	Parc del Fòrum	—N/a	—N/a
July 13	Madrid	Spain	Palacio de Deportes de la Comunidad de Madrid	—	—
July 14	Madrid	Spain	Palacio de Deportes de la Comunidad de Madrid	—	—
July 16	Zürich	Switzerland	Hallenstadion	—	—
July 18 (Note: This performance was part of Sonisphere Festival.)	Hultsfred	Sweden	Folkets Park	—N/a	—N/a
July 20	Copenhagen	Denmark	Forum Copenhagen	48,392 / 48,392	$5,947,788
July 22	Copenhagen	Denmark	Forum Copenhagen	48,392 / 48,392	$5,947,788
July 23	Copenhagen	Denmark	Forum Copenhagen	48,392 / 48,392	$5,947,788
July 25 (Note: This performance was part of Sonisphere Festival.)	Pori	Finland	Kirjurinluoto	—N/a	—N/a
July 27	Copenhagen	Denmark	Forum Copenhagen	(Note: The score data is representative of the all shows at the Forum Copenhagen on July 20, 22-23 and 27-28 respectively.)	
July 28	Copenhagen	Denmark	Forum Copenhagen	(Note: The score data is representative of the all shows at the Forum Copenhagen on July 20, 22-23 and 27-28 respectively.)	
July 30	Oslo	Norway	Spektrum	(Note: The score data is representative of the all shows at the Spektrum on June 17 and July 30 respectively.)	
August 1	Dublin	Ireland	Marlay Park	22,400 / 22,400	$2,218,516
August 2 (Note: This performance was part of Sonisphere Festival.)	Knebworth	England	Knebworth House	—N/a	—N/a
September 11 ^{[3]}	San Rafael	United States	Marin Veterans' Memorial Auditorium	—N/a	—N/a
September 14	Nashville	United States	Sommet Center	15,311 / 15,311	$1,014,175
September 15	Cincinnati	United States	U.S. Bank Arena	13,196 / 13,196	$854,243
September 17	Indianapolis	United States	Conseco Fieldhouse	12,267 / 12,267	$832,731
September 19	Montreal	Canada	Centre Bell	42,925 / 42,925	$3,147,446
September 20	Montreal	Canada	Centre Bell	42,925 / 42,925	$3,147,446
September 28	San Antonio	United States	AT&T Center	17,185 / 17,185	$1,100,908
September 29	Dallas	United States	American Airlines Center	17,790 / 17,790	$1,171,625
October 1	Sunrise	United States	BankAtlantic Center	18,162 / 18,162	$1,182,818
October 3	Tampa	United States	St. Pete Times Forum	19,593 / 19,593	$1,322,359
October 4	Atlanta	United States	Philips Arena	17,603 / 17,603	$1,172,829
October 12	Winnipeg	Canada	MTS Centre	—	—
October 13	Minneapolis	United States	Target Center	18,623 / 18,623	$1,220,279
October 15	Cleveland	United States	Quicken Loans Arena	—	—
October 17	Charlottesville	United States	John Paul Jones Arena	12,247 / 12,247	$804,426
October 18	Charlotte	United States	Time Warner Cable Arena	—	—
October 26	Toronto	Canada	Air Canada Centre	37,181 / 37,181	$2,866,691
October 27	Toronto	Canada	Air Canada Centre	37,181 / 37,181	$2,866,691
October 31	Quebec City	Canada	Colisée Pepsi	30,974 / 30,974	$2,297,106
November 1	Quebec City	Canada	Colisée Pepsi	30,974 / 30,974	$2,297,106
November 3	Ottawa	Canada	Scotiabank Place	—	—
November 9	Grand Rapids	United States	Van Andel Arena	11,615 / 11,615	$767,268
November 10	Buffalo	United States	HSBC Arena	17,460 / 17,460	$1,166,124
November 12	Albany	United States	Times Union Center	14,672 / 14,672	$956,958
November 14	New York City	United States	Madison Square Garden	36,108 / 36,108	$2,539,232
November 15	New York City	United States	Madison Square Garden	36,108 / 36,108	$2,539,232
December 5	Las Vegas	United States	Mandalay Bay Events Center	—	—
December 7	Nampa	United States	Idaho Center	—	—
December 8	Sacramento	United States	ARCO Arena	—	—
December 10	Anaheim	United States	Honda Center	—	—
December 12	San Jose	United States	HP Pavilion	—	—

List of 2010 concerts
Date (2010)	City	Country	Venue	Attendance	Revenue
January 19	Lima	Peru	Estadio Universidad San Marcos	81,641 / 81,641	$5,723,717
January 21	Buenos Aires	Argentina	Estadio Monumental Antonio Vespucio Liberti	94,331 / 94,331	$4,835,210
January 22	Buenos Aires	Argentina	Estadio Monumental Antonio Vespucio Liberti	94,331 / 94,331	$4,835,210
January 24	Córdoba	Argentina	Orfeo Superdomo	9,682 / 9,682	$580,374
January 26	Santiago	Chile	Club Hípico de Santiago	49,117 / 49,117	$3,659,097
January 28	Porto Alegre	Brazil	Parque Condor	23,502 / 23,502	$1,452,474
January 30	São Paulo	Brazil	Estádio do Morumbi	84,435 / 84,435	$8,617,636
January 31	São Paulo	Brazil	Estádio do Morumbi	84,435 / 84,435	$8,617,636
March 1	Guadalajara	Mexico	Estadio Tres de Marzo	27,892 / 27,892	$2,427,868
March 3	Monterrey	Mexico	Estadio Universitario	34,232 / 34,232	$2,191,098
March 5	Guatemala City	Guatemala	Estadio Mateo Flores	—	—
March 7	San José	Costa Rica	Estadio Ricardo Saprissa Aymá	(Note: The score data is representative of the shows in Lima, San Jose and Panama City on January 19 and March 7-8 respectively.)	
March 8	Panama City	Panama	Figali Convention Center	(Note: The score data is representative of the shows in Lima, San Jose and Panama City on January 19 and March 7-8 respectively.)	
March 10	Bogotá	Colombia	Simón Bolívar Park	28,291 / 28,291	$3,151,698
March 12	Caracas	Venezuela	Campos de Beisbol de la Rinconada	25,505 / 25,505	$3,581,392
March 14	San Juan	Puerto Rico	Coliseo de Puerto Rico	17,774 / 17,774	$1,792,301
April 13	Oslo	Norway	Telenor Arena	49,587 / 49,587	$5,059,884
April 14	Oslo	Norway	Telenor Arena	49,587 / 49,587	$5,059,884
April 17	Riga	Latvia	Arena Riga	—	—
April 18	Tallinn	Estonia	Saku Suurhall Arena	—	—
April 20	Vilnius	Lithuania	Siemens Arena	—	—
April 21	Vilnius	Lithuania	Siemens Arena	—	—
April 24	Moscow	Russia	Olympic Stadium	—	—
April 25	Moscow	Russia	Olympic Stadium	—	—
May 11	Belfast	Northern Ireland	Odyssey Arena	—	—
May 12	Belfast	Northern Ireland	Odyssey Arena	—	—
May 14	Budapest	Hungary	Puskás Ferenc Stadium	—	—
May 16	Zagreb	Croatia	Zagreb Hippodrome	—	—
May 18	Lisbon	Portugal	Pavilhão Atlântico	—	—
May 19	Lisbon	Portugal	Pavilhão Atlântico	—	—
May 22	Tel Aviv	Israel	Ramat Gan Stadium	—	—
May 23	Lyon	France	Halle Tony Garnier	—	—
June 14 (Note: This performance was part of Rock in Rio.)	Madrid	Spain	Ciudad del Rock	—N/a	—N/a
June 16 (Note: This performance was part of Sonisphere Festival.)	Warsaw	Poland	Warsaw Babice Airport	—N/a	—N/a
June 18 (Note: This performance was part of Sonisphere Festival.)	Jonschwil	Switzerland	Degenaupark	—N/a	—N/a
June 19 (Note: This performance was part of Sonisphere Festival.)	Milovice	Czech Republic	Milovice Airport	—N/a	—N/a
June 22 (Note: This performance was part of Sonisphere Festival.)	Sofia	Bulgaria	Vasil Levski Stadium	—N/a	—N/a
June 24 (Note: This performance was part of Sonisphere Festival.)	Athens	Greece	Terra Vibe Park	—N/a	—N/a
June 26 (Note: This performance was part of Sonisphere Festival.)	Bucharest	Romania	Romexpo	—N/a	—N/a
June 27 (Note: This performance was part of Sonisphere Festival.)	Istanbul	Turkey	BJK İnönü Stadium	—N/a	—N/a
September 15	Melbourne	Australia	Rod Laver Arena	24,529 / 24,529	$2,849,615
September 16	Melbourne	Australia	Rod Laver Arena	24,529 / 24,529	$2,849,615
September 18	Sydney	Australia	Acer Arena	16,905 / 16,905	$2,190,505
September 21	Christchurch	New Zealand	CBS Canterbury Arena	18,146 / 18,146	$2,292,270
September 22	Christchurch	New Zealand	CBS Canterbury Arena	18,146 / 18,146	$2,292,270
September 25	Saitama	Japan	Saitama Super Arena	—	—
September 26	Saitama	Japan	Saitama Super Arena	—	—
October 13	Auckland	New Zealand	Vector Arena	23,756 / 23,756	$2,126,135
October 14	Auckland	New Zealand	Vector Arena	23,756 / 23,756	$2,126,135
October 16	Brisbane	Australia	Brisbane Entertainment Centre	42,603 / 42,603	$5,984,206
October 18	Brisbane	Australia	Brisbane Entertainment Centre	42,603 / 42,603	$5,984,206
October 19	Brisbane	Australia	Brisbane Entertainment Centre	42,603 / 42,603	$5,984,206
October 22	Perth	Australia	Burswood Dome	41,943 / 41,943	$5,071,110
October 23	Perth	Australia	Burswood Dome	41,943 / 41,943	$5,071,110
November 4	Santa Monica	United States	Santa Monica Airport	—	—
November 10	Sydney	Australia	Acer Arena	57,339 / 57,339	$7,819,245
November 11	Sydney	Australia	Acer Arena	57,339 / 57,339	$7,819,245
November 13	Sydney	Australia	Acer Arena	57,339 / 57,339	$7,819,245
November 15	Adelaide	Australia	Adelaide Entertainment Centre	—	—
November 16	Adelaide	Australia	Adelaide Entertainment Centre	—	—
November 18	Melbourne	Australia	Rod Laver Arena	45,117 / 45,117	$5,499,424
November 20	Melbourne	Australia	Rod Laver Arena	45,117 / 45,117	$5,499,424
November 21	Melbourne	Australia	Rod Laver Arena	45,117 / 45,117	$5,499,424
Total				2,078,431	$140,410,363

- 1 = Open to invited guests, fan club members and contest winners ).
- 2 = Rescheduled from March 8, 2009.
- 3 = Benefit show for Marin History Museum's new "Marin Rocks" exhibition, opening in 2010.

=== Canceled dates ===
List of canceled concerts
Date	City	Country	Venue	Reason
April 18, 2010	Riga	Latvia	Arēna Rīga	Date canceled due to low demand for tickets, caused by the "recent unprecedented economic downturn in Latvia." The concert, which was one of two shows to be held in Riga, was "consolidated" with the preceding Riga date and a show in Tallinn was announced in its place. Ticket-holders had the option of attending either the April 17, 2010 show in Riga or the new date in Tallinn.

== Personnel ==
- James Hetfield – vocals, rhythm guitar
- Kirk Hammett – lead guitar
- Lars Ulrich – drums
- Robert Trujillo – bass
