= The Unforgiven III =

Song by Metallica

from the album Death Magnetic
- Released: September 12, 2008
- Genre: Thrash metal
- Length: 7:47
- Label: Warner Bros.
- Composers: James Hetfield; Lars Ulrich; Kirk Hammett; Robert Trujillo
- Lyricist: James Hetfield
- Producer: Rick Rubin

"The Unforgiven III" is a song by American heavy metal band Metallica from their ninth studio album, Death Magnetic (2008). It is a sequel to two of the band's past songs: "The Unforgiven II" and "The Unforgiven". It peaked at No. 14 on the Bubbling Under Hot 100 chart.

== History ==
In an interview for MTV, James Hetfield said that the song is "continuation of the same storyline about sin and consequence, forgiveness and unforgiveness." Hetfield has also said that, of all parts of "The Unforgiven," this is his favorite. Robert Trujillo said "it's got a great flow and it's very dynamic. It's somehow connected to the [remaining] body music of the album."

A live version was performed for the first time on April 14, 2010, in Oslo, Norway, and only played a few times afterwards with the last performance being on November 21, 2010. It was played for the first time in almost eight years in Lincoln, Nebraska, on September 6, 2018, and was next performed on the two nights of Metallica and the San Francisco Symphony's S&M2 at the Chase Center, albeit in an alternate form featuring only Hetfield and the orchestra.

== Composition and lyrics ==
"The Unforgiven III" is a thrash metal power ballad that serves as a continuation of the band's past singles "The Unforgiven" and "The Unforgiven II". In comparison to those its predecessors, "The Unforgiven III" features a softer composition; Brady Gerber of Vulture described the song as the most "reflective" in the trilogy, and compared it to another song from the album, "The Day That Never Comes". Hetfield explained that the song was purely about self-forgiveness, saying that it was asking the question of "how can I forgive you if I can't forgive myself?". This was in contrast to the first song in the trilogy, which Hetfield said that he had none of while writing it.

== Reception ==
Stephen Thomas Erlewine from AllMusic in his review of the album, described the song as having "symphonic tension". In 2010, it was nominated for the Grammy Award for Best Hard Rock Performance, but lost to "War Machine" by AC/DC.

== Personnel ==
Metallica

- James Hetfield – rhythm guitar, vocals
- Lars Ulrich – drums
- Kirk Hammett – lead guitar
- Robert Trujillo – bass

Additional musicians

- David Campbell – orchestration

== Chart performance ==
Chart (2008)	Peak position
Australia (ARIA)	41
Belgium (Ultratop 50 Flanders)	50
Denmark (Tracklisten)	24
Finland (Suomen virallinen lista)	16
Norway (VG-lista)	8
Sweden (Sverigetopplistan)	34
UK Singles (Official Charts Company)	120
US Bubbling Under Hot 100 (Billboard)	14

== Certifications ==
Region	Certification	Certified units/sales
Australia (ARIA)	Gold	35,000^{‡}
^{‡} Sales+streaming figures based on certification alone.
