= The Unforgiven (song) =

1991 single by Metallica

Single by Metallica

from the album Metallica
- B-side: "Killing Time"
- Released: October 28, 1991
- Studio: One on One (Los Angeles)
- Genre: Heavy metal; hard rock
- Length: 6:27
- Label: Elektra
- Composers: James Hetfield; Lars Ulrich; Kirk Hammett
- Lyricist: James Hetfield
- Producers: Bob Rock; James Hetfield; Lars Ulrich

Metallica singles chronology
"Enter Sandman" (1991)	"The Unforgiven" (1991)	"Nothing Else Matters" (1992)

Music video
- "The Unforgiven" on YouTube

"The Unforgiven" is a song by the American heavy metal band Metallica. It was released as the second single from their eponymous fifth album Metallica (also known as The Black Album) (1991). The song deals with the theme of the struggle of the individual against the efforts of those who would subjugate him.

The song has since spawned two sequels, in the form of "The Unforgiven II", from the album Reload, and "The Unforgiven III", from the album Death Magnetic.

== History ==
Lars Ulrich explained that the band wanted to try something new with the idea of a ballad. Instead of the standard melodic verse and heavy chorus – as evidenced on their previous ballads "Fade to Black", "Welcome Home (Sanitarium)" and "One" – the band opted to reverse the dynamic, with heavy, distorted verses and a softer, melodic chorus, played with clean electric and acoustic guitars. The opening section contains percussive instruments performed by Ulrich, and also a small amount of keyboards.

In the documentary "Classic Albums" Metallica: The Black Album, James Hetfield could not identify where the horn intro was taken from and explained that it was reversed so its source would be hidden.

Kirk Hammett said his solo was a last minute improvisation of "raw emotion" after the ideas he came with at the studio ended up not working. Pleased with the result, Hammett said it was the starting point of him playing less scripted solos in future songs.

== Live performances ==
"The Unforgiven" was played live as part of Metallica's "Wherever We May Roam" and "Nowhere Else to Roam" world tours, which lasted from 1991 to 1993, in support of The Black Album. It was played again after being off the setlist for 11 years on the Madly in Anger with the World Tour in 2004 and has been continued to be played during all of the band's tours since.

The live version of "The Unforgiven" includes a second solo near the end of the song that the original recording did not have, although this part has rarely been played since the early 2000s.

== Music video ==
Directed by Matt Mahurin, the music video filmed in September 1991 in Los Angeles and premiered on 19 November 1991. The black-and-white video is themed around a barefoot and shirtless boy born in captivity who spends his life in a windowless stone room. As the video progresses, he ages into an adult and then an old man. He spends his entire life carving into the stone to create a window while occasionally grasping his one possession: a key. It is implied that another captive lives on the other side of the stone room. The video ends with the old man finally creating a window, through which he deposits his possession. He blocks off the tunnel through which he crawled to access the cell using the square of stone he created when he made the window, then lies down to die. An 11:33 long, "theatrical" version of the video exists, featuring several minutes of introductory scenes that precede the timeline of the main portion of the video. This version was featured on The Videos 1989–2004, the band's 2006 music video compilation.

== Personnel ==
Metallica

- James Hetfield – rhythm guitar, classical guitar, vocals
- Lars Ulrich – drums, percussion
- Kirk Hammett – lead guitar
- Jason Newsted – bass

Additional musician

- Uncredited musician ("Scott") – keyboard

== Charts ==
=== Weekly charts ===
Chart (1991–1992)	Peak position
Australia (ARIA)	10
Canada Retail Singles (The Record)	11
Europe (Eurochart Hot 100)	46
Finland (The Official Finnish Charts)	4
France (SNEP)	28
Germany (GfK)	47
Ireland (IRMA)	22
Netherlands (Dutch Top 40)	27
Netherlands (Single Top 100)	25
New Zealand (Recorded Music NZ)	24
Sweden (Sverigetopplistan)	32
UK Singles (Official Charts)	15
US Billboard Hot 100	35
US Mainstream Rock (Billboard)	10
US Cash Box Top 100	73

Chart (2022)	Peak position
Poland Airplay (ZPAV)	93

Chart (2026)	Peak position
Greece International (IFPI)	20

=== Year-end charts ===
Chart (1992)	Position
Brazil (Crowley)	88
US Album Rock Tracks (Billboard)	19

== Certifications ==
Region	Certification	Certified units/sales
Australia (ARIA)	3× Platinum	210,000^{‡}
Brazil (Pro-Música Brasil)	Gold	30,000^{‡}
Germany (BVMI)	Gold	300,000^{‡}
Italy (FIMI)	Gold	35,000^{‡}
New Zealand (RMNZ)	Platinum	30,000^{‡}
Spain (Promusicae)	Gold	30,000^{‡}
United Kingdom (BPI)	Silver	200,000^{‡}
United States (RIAA)	2× Platinum	2,000,000^{‡}
Streaming
Greece (IFPI Greece)	Platinum	2,000,000^{†}
^{‡} Sales+streaming figures based on certification alone.^{†} Streaming-only figures based on certification alone.
