= My Apocalypse =

Single by Metallica

from the album Death Magnetic
- Released: August 26, 2008
- Recorded: March 12, 2007–May 11, 2008 at Sound City in Van Nuys, Los Angeles, California; Shangri La Studios in Malibu, California and HQ in San Rafael, California
- Genre: Thrash metal
- Length: 5:01
- Label: Warner Bros.; Mercury
- Composers: James Hetfield; Lars Ulrich; Kirk Hammett; Robert Trujillo
- Lyricist: James Hetfield
- Producer: Rick Rubin

Metallica singles chronology
"The Day That Never Comes" (2008)	"My Apocalypse" (2008)	"Cyanide" (2008)

"My Apocalypse" is a song by American heavy metal band Metallica, and the second single from their studio album Death Magnetic, and is the final track on the album. On August 26, 2008, it was made available for streaming on the band's official website, as well as a download (for Platinum Members only) on the Death Magnetic website Mission: Metallica. The song was later released as a digital single in the iTunes Store.

The band first performed this song in Birmingham, England on March 25, 2009, during their World Magnetic Tour. "'My Apocalypse' was a cool song," remarked bassist Robert Trujillo. "It was fast; it had the thrash element of the past." The name of its parent album is derived from its lyric, "Death magnetic, pulling closer still."

At the 2009 Grammy Awards, the single won the "Best Metal Performance" category.

More recently, a new introduction to the song was added. Lars Ulrich said, "We've been enjoying playing 'My Apocalypse' out here on the road but felt like it could use something extra. We decided that it needed a cool intro to set the mood so James wrote one."

At 5 minutes and 1 second long, "My Apocalypse" is the shortest song on Death Magnetic.

== Track listing ==
Digital single
No.	Title	Length
1.	"My Apocalypse"	5:01

== Charts ==
Chart (2008)	Peak position
Australian ARIA Singles Chart	38
Austrian Singles Chart	56
Belgium Singles Top 50	49
Canadian Hot 100	28
Denmark Singles Chart	15
Finland Singles Top 20	3
Irish Singles Chart	45
Italy (FIMI)	48
Norway Singles Chart	9
Swedish Singles Chart	15
UK Singles Chart	51
U.S. Billboard Hot 100	67
U.S. Billboard Mainstream Rock Tracks	38

== Personnel ==
Metallica

- James Hetfield – rhythm guitar, vocals
- Lars Ulrich – drums
- Kirk Hammett – lead guitar
- Robert Trujillo – bass guitar

Production

- Rick Rubin – producer
- Ted Jensen – mastering
- Greg Fidelman – mixing
