= Guitar Hero: Metallica =

2009 video game

- Cover art with the corrected spelling of the band Metallica
- Developer: Neversoft (Note: Ported to PlayStation 2 and Wii by Budcat Creations)
- Publisher: Activision
- Series: Guitar Hero
- Platforms: PlayStation 2, PlayStation 3, Wii, Xbox 360
- Release: PlayStation 3, Wii & Xbox 360: NA: March 29, 2009; AU: May 27, 2009; EU: May 29, 2009; PlayStation 2: NA: April 14, 2009; AU: May 27, 2009; EU: May 29, 2009
- Genre: Rhythm
- Modes: Single-player, multiplayer

Guitar Hero: Metallica is a 2009 rhythm game developed by Neversoft and published by Activision. It is the seventh installment in the Guitar Hero series and the second to focus on the career and songs of one rock band, Metallica, following Guitar Hero: Aerosmith (2008). The game was released in North America on the PlayStation 3, Wii, and Xbox 360 on March 29, 2009, and on PlayStation 2 on April 14, 2009, with an Australian and European release in May 2009.

The game is based on Guitar Hero World Tour (2008), with support for lead and bass guitar, drums, and vocals. The game has many of the same features from World Tour, including single-player and band Career modes, online competitive modes, and the ability to create and share songs through "GHTunes". In addition to the normal difficulty levels presented in Guitar Hero World Tour, Guitar Hero: Metallica provides an "Expert+" difficulty for drums that allows the use of a second bass drum pedal to match the drumming style of Metallica's Lars Ulrich. The game features 28 master recordings spanning Metallica's career and an additional 21 songs selected by members of Metallica. The band performed extensive motion capture for the game for their in-game avatars and performances. The game includes several extras including behind-the-scenes videos of the motion capture sessions, tour and concert videos of the band, and Pop-Up Video-like facts for many of the songs on the game disc.

Guitar Hero: Metallica received positive reviews, with critics stating it to be a strong tribute to the band and Neversoft's best work on the Guitar Hero series to date. The difficulty throughout the game was praised, found to be more enjoyable to players of all skill levels than the more-difficult Guitar Hero III: Legends of Rock. Reviewers noted the lack of additional downloadable content, save for the pre-existing Death Magnetic songs, the cartoonish storyline for the Career mode, and the overall value of the game as some of the negatives to the experience.

== Gameplay ==
Guitar Hero: Metallica, like other games in the Guitar Hero series, allows players to simulate the playing of rock music using special instrument controllers. The game is based on the band approach presented in Guitar Hero World Tour, and features parts of lead and bass guitar, drums, and vocals. To successfully complete songs and score, players must use the instruments to play notes that scroll on-screen in time with the music. For lead and bass guitar players, this is done by holding down colored fret buttons on the guitar neck while striking a strum bar; for the drum players, this requires the player to strike the appropriate drum pad or kick with the bass drum pedal; for vocals, the player must attempt to match the pitch of the notes through a microphone. Players earn scoring multipliers for playing several consecutive notes or phrases correctly, and by correctly completing marked phrases, players can earn Star Power which can be released for a higher scoring multiplier. If players miss too many notes, they will eventually fail the song and will have to retry it.

Lead developer Alan Flores has stated that the difficulty of the game is much harder than previous games and is designed to challenge the hard-core player. To meet the "ferocity" of Metallica's songs, the game features, in addition to the same five difficulty levels in World Tour, an "Expert+" mode for drummers that allows them to add a second bass drum pedal, though results of this mode are not tracked through online modes. Additional drum pedals and a splitter, to allow two pedals to be used, were made available upon the game's release and as part of pre-ordering bonuses. While the game allows two guitar players to play lead and bass guitar, it does not give the players the option to play lead and rhythm guitar, which does not allow for notable "Hetfield/Hammett riff-trading" on certain songs. Lead designer Alan Flores explained that the decision not to track the lead and rhythm (in addition to the single player guitar, bass, drums, and vocals) "was simply a workload issue."

Similar to Guitar Hero: Aerosmith, Metallica presents songs from Metallica's history roughly in chronological order, but it focuses more on the group today than the band's history. The songs in the game are presented in a linear series of sets as with older Guitar Hero games such as Guitar Hero III: Legends of Rock, instead of the gig progression used in World Tour. However, instead of being required to finish a certain number of songs in each set, the player has to earn a total number of stars (earned from their performance on the individual songs) in a given set to progress to next one. The game's story is based on a band that wants to follow in Metallica's footsteps, and the group accepting them as leading acts for them on a tour; as such, they are better able to order the songs in difficulty comparable to other Guitar Hero games, as Metallica's earlier works frustrate the player enough to "throw the controller against the wall and stop playing". Flores described the difficulty for most of the game to be comparable to Guitar Hero: Aerosmith and World Tour after the complaints of the difficulty level in Guitar Hero III, but further noted that the most difficult songs in the games will be very challenging. Real-life venues are used for the game, including The Stone nightclub in San Francisco, the Hammersmith Odeon in London, Tushino Airfield in Moscow, and The Forum in Los Angeles, and one final venue representing the pinnacle of Metallica's success. The game was completed before Metallica's induction into the Rock and Roll Hall of Fame, and thus does not include reference to this event. The game's interface remain similar to World Tour with some Metallica-based artwork added to it. Three changes have been made from World Tour; individual performance and Star Power meters are now located next to each track on screen instead of grouped together to make it easier to keep track of one's own performance, and when the band's performance is failing, the edges of the screen glow red to indicate this. Furthermore, the score and note streak counters have now been moved to the right side of the screen, with the addition of the star counter.

The music creation mode from World Tour is available, giving the player the option of using tones from Hetfields' ESP Truckster guitar and Slayer's Tom Araya's ESP Bass in addition to Metallica drum sounds. The "GHTunes" services, which allows players to share songs created in the music creation mode, is cross-compatible with both World Tour and Metallica. In the new "Drum Over" mode for this game, players can select any song, and play drums without any fixed drum track or without any failure, allowing them to create their own drum line using the song's existing drum kit sounds.

The Battle mode of the game, based on that from Guitar Hero III: Legends of Rock, has been slightly altered to add Metallica influences; for example, a power-up named "Fade to Black" completely blackens the note tracks for the opposing player, "Trapped Under Ice", which freezes the whammy bar, and an electrical attack called "Ride the Lightning" (based on the "Amp Overload" attack from Guitar Hero III) is added.

== Development ==
Guitar Hero: Metallica was revealed to be in production when an analyst for Wedbush Morgan Securities discovered mention of the game in Activision's 2008 SEC filings, slated to be released in "fiscal 2009". The band was approached in April 2008, who quickly agreed to the game as a "no brainer". Development for the game began in the second quarter of 2008, according to lead designer Alan Flores. Two posts made to Metallica's website in June 2008 also referred to the "not so top secret GH thing", and that Guitar Hero players could expect "a pile of 'Tallica songs." Lars Ulrich, when asked about the game during an interview with MTV, stated that "the people at ‘Guitar Hero’ and Activision are rapidly becoming our best new friends in the world. You can put the rest of it together yourself." Ulrich stated that the idea for the Metallica-themed Guitar Hero game came from the influence the original Guitar Hero games had on Ulrich and James Hetfield's children, learning about music and older bands such as Deep Purple and Black Sabbath.

The game was officially announced at the 2008 E3 conference during Microsoft's presentation, along with the announcement that Metallica's newest album, Death Magnetic, would be made as content for download for both Guitar Hero III: Legends of Rock and Guitar Hero World Tour. A trailer for the game is included as an extra feature in Guitar Hero World Tour with "Master of Puppets" playing in the background and "Ride the Lightning" as the tagline.

Members of Metallica performed extensive motion capture for their in-game avatars in Guitar Hero: Metallica. Venues were also created based on the covers of Metallica's albums, such as Master of Puppets shown above.

As with Guitar Hero: Aerosmith, members of Metallica, including Kirk Hammett, Lars Ulrich, James Hetfield and Robert Trujillo performed six songs and band and audience chatter for motion capture for their in-game avatars; the detailed motion capture included the band's lip syncing to the lyrics and the motion of Trujillo's hair braids. Ulrich and Hetfield performed additional motion capturing sessions to help the developers. Metallica members appear as their modern day incarnations, but unlockable skins are available to reflect the band's history. Former band members Jason Newsted and the late Cliff Burton are not represented in the game as the band felt their inclusion would slight Trujillo. However, the game still includes trivia about both former members. The game includes DVD-style content such as photos, videos, and behind-the-scenes footage, as well as "Metallifacts", Pop-up Video-style trivia displayed on screen during the various Metallica tracks. Some Metallica songs in the game have an accompanying video of the band performing the song, with the quality ranging from fan-made videos at small clubs to large-scale video productions. Both Motörhead vocalist/bassist Lemmy and Mercyful Fate singer King Diamond have contributed to the game in both providing motion capture for unlockable player characters and providing re-recorded tracks of their songs "Ace of Spades" and "Evil", respectively due to the original master tapes not being located for use in the game's production. King Diamond's notable face makeup and jewelry was altered with direct input from King Diamond to avoid offending the religion of any of the business partners involved with the game.

During the game's development, the team encountered problems trying to create the drum tracks. Flores noted they normally try to map a note for every drum beat but could not easily replicate it for the double bass often used in Metallica's songs. As a result, they decided to create a splitter for the bass drum pedal and offer a second pedal with the game to allow the double bass kicks to be retained. The game's career mode, in which the players are part of an opening band for Metallica, is based on a real-life group that followed Metallica during a European tour, eventually becoming enamored by the band and performing in an opening act with them.

No plans have been announced for special bundled versions of Guitar Hero: Metallica with the instrument controllers within North America, though Activision does plan to release Metallica-branded faceplates for existing instrument controllers as well as a double-bass pedal attachment for the drum controller. Guitar Hero: Metallica will also support the wireless microphones from Lips through a future title patch. A European-exclusive bundle includes the game, wireless guitar controller, and Metallica faceplate.

=== Promotion ===
Players that pre-ordered Guitar Hero: Metallica through GameStop stores received a second kickpedal with pre-orders. Other stores offered Guitar Hero: Metallica-branded drumsticks with pre-orders.

A demo version of the game was released on Xbox Live on March 20, 2009, with four playable songs: Metallica's "Sad but True" and "Seek & Destroy", Alice in Chains' "No Excuses" and Queen's "Stone Cold Crazy". All four instruments are playable. There is no Expert+ for the drums in the demo. Metallica made an appearance at the 2009 SXSW Music Festival held a week before the game's release for a "not-so-secret" performance, with demonstration stations set up to allow attendees to play the game. The game was the primary sponsor for Aric Almirola's Number 8 car in the 2009 NASCAR Sprint Cup Series Goody's Fast Relief 500 run during the weekend of the game's release, alongside a primary sponsorship in collaboration with GameStop for Joey Logano's Number 20 car in the 2009 NASCAR Nationwide Series O'Reilly 300 which ran in the weekend following the game's release. Two television commercials, in the same style as those for Guitar Hero World Tour that parody the scene from Risky Business where Tom Cruise dances in his underwear during Bob Seger's song "Old Time Rock and Roll", were prepared for the game and were directed by Brett Ratner. The ads, which first aired during the 2009 NCAA basketball tournament, features NCAA coaches Bob Knight, Mike Krzyzewski, Roy Williams, and Rick Pitino along with the current members of Metallica.

== Soundtrack ==
Guitar Hero: Metallica features 49 songs based on master recordings, 28 by Metallica, and the other 21 songs by bands that are "their personal favorites and influences from over the years", including those that appeared on their Garage Inc. album. All of the Metallica songs in the game are from original masters, though locating some masters proved troublesome. Though Metallica were prepared to re-record songs as Aerosmith had done for Guitar Hero: Aerosmith, they were able to find the masters for their debut album Kill 'Em All in the basement of their former manager Johny Zazula. While other downloadable content from Guitar Hero III or Guitar Hero World Tour is not usable in Guitar Hero: Metallica, the game will detect and incorporate the songs from the Death Magnetic downloadable content into the game's setlist (however, the song "All Nightmare Long" is available in the game as part of its main setlist). The PlayStation 2 and Wii versions of the game do not support downloadable content, but include "Broken, Beat & Scarred", "Cyanide" and "My Apocalypse" from Death Magnetic in addition to the game's existing tracks. The 1998 medley of covers of the band Mercyful Fate's songs "Mercyful Fate" is the longest track included in the game, running at around 11 minutes.

Metallica selected songs from their catalog that "pretty evenly represent all the different phases" of the band. Lars Ulrich noted that the band stood up for the inclusion of the band Slayer against Microsoft's concerns over the explicit lyrical content of the group's songs. Alan Flores, lead designer for the game, noted that the band had originally requested Slayer's "Angel of Death" but Microsoft refused to clear the song due to its lyrics regarding The Holocaust. Instead, at the urging of Ulrich, Neversoft successfully cleared "War Ensemble" and rushed to include it in the game at the last second. Ulrich also sought Mercyful Fate's "Evil" and "Curse of the Pharaohs" directly by King Diamond, but the latter was unable to find the masters; instead, King Diamond was able to bring the band together, though with Bjarne T. Holm replacing Kim Ruzz on drums, to record new masters for both songs. "Evil" was ultimately used over "Curse of the Pharaohs" due to gameplay-friendliness. Kirk Hammett stated that the band wanted to have songs from UFO and The Misfits, but could not get these groups for legal reasons, and instead settled on songs from Michael Schenker Group and Samhain, bands that were started by former members of those respective bands.

Thirty-nine songs from the on-disc soundtrack of Guitar Hero: Metallica will be importable as playable tracks for Guitar Hero: Warriors of Rock.

== Reception ==
Reception

Aggregate scores
Aggregator	Score
GameRankings	85.4%
Metacritic	86/100

Review scores
Publication	Score
Eurogamer	8/10
G4	4/5
Game Informer	8.75/10
GameSpot	7.5/10
IGN	8.9/10
Official Nintendo Magazine	88%
Official Xbox Magazine (US)	8.5/10

Guitar Hero: Metallica has received favorable reviews from game critics, and has been described as the best Guitar Hero game in the series since Neversoft took over development of the franchise. Ben Kuchera of Ars Technica noted that with numerous other Guitar Hero titles, Guitar Hero: Metallica could have been "just another way to cash-in on the hype cheaply", but the overall quality of the game shows that "the design team adores Metallica". Simon Parkin of Eurogamer stated that Guitar Hero: Metallica "sets the benchmark" for future band-specific games from either Guitar Hero or Rock Band.

Reviews have primarily praised the game for a "stellar" set list that "[reads] like the quintessential 'Best Of' track list for the band", and consider "the best hit to miss ratio of any music game to date". The difficulty of the songs was also warmly received, with reviews noting that Metallica's songs can "[translate] really well to a plastic guitar", and that "the songs here are a treat on any skill level". However, the game still provides a difficult challenge for experienced players, and the introduction of the Expert+ difficulty for drums and the Drum Over mode were seen as good additions. Reviews commented favorably on the new career progression, noting that one can complete the career mode without having to play "Metallica's earliest, shreddiest, most brutal stuff", and allows the player to "skip right past the early stuff and quickly get to the big tracks".

The overall presentation of the game was highly praised, noting that "a lot of care was put into making sure this was a die-hard fan's game" and praising the devotion to the motion capture work done by the band. The added features such as Metallifacts and additional behind-the-scenes videos were attributed to "ensuring that this isn't just a slapped-together take on World Tour with Metallica songs". It is generally regarded as the most successful Guitar Hero spin-off game, as opposed to other spin-offs in the series which failed to match its success and popularity.

The game was criticized for the lack of downloadable content beyond the existing Death Magnetic album, and its price was also called into question, costing the same as World Tour but with fewer songs. The career mode's "cartoon storyline" describing the player's Metallica's-wannabe band was seen as being out of place in the game and was considered as the game's "biggest weakness". Chris Roper of IGN noted that the PlayStation 2 version of the game suffers from several graphical problems, including poor video compression, the inability to read or zoom in on handwritten tour and lyric sheets, and some stuttering on the display on the note highway, and considers it the weakest release across all the game's platforms. Roper also cites video compression and problems with viewing the extras in the Wii version.

As of March 2010, the game has sold 1.5 million copies worldwide, with approximately 1 million copies from North American sales.
