= Death Magnetic =

Studio album by Metallica
- Released: September 12, 2008
- Recorded: March 10, 2007 – May 22, 2008
- Studios: Sound City (Los Angeles); Shangri-La (Malibu); Metallica's HQ (San Rafael)
- Genres: Thrash metal; heavy metal
- Length: 74:54
- Labels: Warner Bros.; Vertigo
- Producer: Rick Rubin

Metallica chronology
St. Anger (2003)	Death Magnetic (2008)	Orgullo, Pasión, y Gloria: Tres Noches en la Ciudad de México (2009)

Singles from Death Magnetic
- 1. "The Day That Never Comes" Released: August 21, 2008; 2. "My Apocalypse" Released: August 26, 2008; 3. "All Nightmare Long" Released: December 15, 2008; 4. "Broken, Beat & Scarred" Released: April 3, 2009

Death Magnetic is the ninth studio album by American heavy metal band Metallica, released on September 12, 2008, through Warner Bros. Records in the United States and Vertigo Records elsewhere. The album was produced by Rick Rubin, marking the band's first album since ...And Justice For All (1988) not to be produced by longtime collaborator Bob Rock, and with James Hetfield and Lars Ulrich as co-producers. It is also the first Metallica album to feature bassist Robert Trujillo, and the second album where all the band's members shared writing credits.

Metallica began writing music for a new album in 2006, later recording the album at different studios across Los Angeles County, California, from March 2007 to May 2008. Musically, Death Magnetic is a radical departure from Metallica's previous album, St. Anger (2003), and is considered a return to the band's thrash metal roots, with more complex compositions, standard guitar tuning on most songs and long guitar solos from Kirk Hammett and James Hetfield. It also includes the band's first fully instrumental piece, "Suicide & Redemption", since "Orion" from Master of Puppets (1986).

Death Magnetic made Metallica the first band to achieve five consecutive number-one studio albums on the U.S. Billboard 200. The album received positive reviews from critics, who considered it a return to form for Metallica. However, the album's production was criticized as overcompressed and cited as a product of the loudness war. The album and its songs were nominated for six Grammy Awards (five in 2009 and one in 2010) and won three, including Best Metal Performance for "My Apocalypse". In support of the album, Metallica embarked on the World Magnetic Tour from October 2008 to November 2010. Four unreleased tracks from the album's recording sessions were later released as the Beyond Magnetic EP in December 2011.

== Writing and recording ==
If you're in the studio, everybody presumes you're recording or making a record. Last time there was no real separation between the writing process and the recording process. With St. Anger nobody brought in any pre-recorded stuff or ideas; it was just make it up on the spot, be in the moment. So this time we are doing exactly what we did on all the other albums;— first we're writing, then we're recording. The only difference is that we're writing where we record. So we're writing here at HQ because this is our home, we're writing in the studio.

— Lars Ulrich, on the new album

Early in 2004, lead singer James Hetfield revealed that Metallica had been playing new material during studio sessions, but that there was no mention of plans for a ninth studio album at that time. Select music from the jam sessions may be used on the album, as Lars Ulrich stated, "I definitely look forward to sifting through some of that stuff when we get back to the studio in January." On that note, by October 2004, the band had already compiled nearly 50 hours of pre-set jamming, with hundreds of riffs, chord progressions and bass lines. On September 30, 2004, Launch Radio revealed from an interview with Hetfield that the band hoped to return to the studio in spring of 2005 to begin recording their ninth studio album for Warner Bros. Records.

On March 10, 2006, it was reported that Metallica was planning to use the following six months to write material for the album, in addition to the previous two months they had already been spending writing music. Ulrich also stated that the band was getting along much better in the studio than they did during the recording of St. Anger. On April 6, he revealed that the band had composed "six to seven" songs (except for vocals) from their findings off the riff tapes recording during pre-sets of the Madly in Anger with the World Tour. He also said that by this point, the band's new material was reminiscent of "old school" Metallica works, and that it certainly did not feel like a St. Anger "part two".

On May 20, 2006, Kirk Hammett revealed that the band had fifteen songs written and were writing on average two to three songs per week. Hetfield also praised producer Rick Rubin for his production style in giving the band their own freedom and keeping the pressure at a minimum, despite the sessions becoming sometimes briefly unfocused. On May 27, Metallica updated their website with a video featuring information regarding the album.

Three studios were used to produce the album, those being Sound City Studios in Van Nuys, California, Shangri La Studios in Malibu, California, and HQ in San Rafael, California. On January 1, 2007, Ulrich stated in an interview with Revolver that the band would be conceiving the album much like they did their albums prior to working with ex-producer Bob Rock; they would sit down, write a select number of songs, then enter the studio to record them. He also quoted Rubin by saying "Rubin didn't want them to start the recording process until every song that they were going to record was as close to 100 percent as possible."

On March 5, Ulrich revealed that the band had narrowed a potential 25 songs down to 14, and that they would begin recording those fourteen on the following week. He also expanded on Rubin's style of production, saying,

Rick's big thing is to kind of have all these songs completely embedded in our bodies and basically next Monday, on D-Day, just go in and execute them. So you leave the creative element of the process out of the recording, so you go in and basically just record a bunch of songs that you know inside out and upside down, and you don't have to spend too much of your energy in the recording studio creating and thinking and analyzing and doing all that stuff. His whole analogy is, the recording process becomes more like a gig—just going in and playing and leaving all the thinking at the door.

On March 14, the band's official website issued a statement: "Metallica left the comfort of HQ this week to descend upon the greater Los Angeles area to begin recording their ninth original album. This is the first time they've recorded outside of the Bay Area since they spent time at One-on-One Studios recording their self-titled album in 1990 and '91." This was confirmed on July 24, 2008, on Mission: Metallica, as a video surfaced showing the crew moving into Sound City Studios of Nirvana fame.

On June 4, 2007, Robert Trujillo revealed that only select portions of the two new songs debuted in Berlin and Tokyo respectively would be featured on the album. The band hoped to have the album finished by October or November, when the album would be mixed. He predicted the album would be out in February 2008, and revealed that the songs they were working with were quite long. On February 2, 2008, Sterlingsound.com revealed that Ted Jensen from Sterling Sound Studios would be mastering the new record. According to Blabbermouth.net and other sources, Greg Fidelman, who had served as a sound engineer, had also been tapped to mix the album. Ulrich confirmed on May 15, 2008, that Metallica recorded eleven songs for Death Magnetic, although only ten would appear on the album due to the constraints of the physical medium. The eleventh song, titled "Shine" (which was later retitled "Just a Bullet Away"), was a song Hetfield "based around a Layne Staley type, a rock & roll martyr magnetized by death."

=== Unreleased tracks ===
A number of unreleased songs from Death Magnetic, including the above-mentioned "Just a Bullet Away", but also "Hell and Back", "Hate Train" and "Rebel of Babylon" were left off the album, but were rumored to be released as B-sides or on the next album. The titles were confirmed by Hammett and Ulrich on the MetOnTour video from December 20, 2008. On December 5, 7, 9 and 10, 2011, the band played four new songs, "Hate Train", "Just a Bullet Away", "Hell and Back" and "Rebel of Babylon", at the band's 30th Anniversary concerts. The day after each concert, MetClub members were sent an e-mail with a code for a free download of a rough mix of the song played at the show. The songs were released officially on the Beyond Magnetic EP, released on December 13, 2011. Two other songs recorded during Death Magnetic, based on "The New Song" (performed in 2006) and "The Other New Song" (performed in 2006 and 2007), have not been released, though parts of "The New Song" can be found in the recorded songs "The End of the Line" and "All Nightmare Long".

== Packaging ==
Kirk Hammett played a role in inspiring the album title by bringing a photograph of deceased Alice in Chains singer Layne Staley to the studio where Metallica was recording. "That picture was there for a long time", said Hammett, "I think it pervaded James' psyche." Wondering why someone with Staley's talent would choose to use drugs so heavily and die so young, Hetfield started writing a song based on his questions (the song "Rebel of Babylon").

On July 16, 2008, Hetfield commented on the album's title:

Death Magnetic, at least the title, to me started out as kind of a tribute to people that have fallen in our business, like Layne Staley and a lot of the people that have died, basically—rock and roll martyrs of sorts. And then it kind of grew from there, thinking about death ... some people are drawn towards it, and just like a magnet, and other people are afraid of it and push. Also the concept that we're all gonna die sometimes is over-talked about and then a lot of times never talked about—no one wants to bring it up; it's the big white elephant in the living room. But we all have to deal with it at some point.

The title is referenced in the track "My Apocalypse". According to Hammett, another title considered for the album was Songs of Suicide and Forgiveness. Death Magnetic was eventually picked out of four working titles when Hetfield met with creative agency Turner Duckworth, who were brought in to deal with the album's visual identity, and as he discussed the songs "it was clear that they were all linked to death, facing up to the nature of death, and the fear and attraction that surrounds death."

For the album's physical packaging, Ulrich brought the agency Turner Duckworth, co-owned by his personal friend David Turner, as he wanted someone that "would bring fresh ideas", and commanded respect in branding but were not jaded by the music business. While Turner and his partner Bruce Duckworth played with the two elements from the title, they emerged with the cover that combined a white coffin, a grave, and a magnetic field, depicted by a model made and photographed by Andy Grimshaw. Turner added the image was "simple and literal but at the same time open to all sorts of interpretations", saying that Hetfield considered the coffin shaped as "a door, to another experience, or consciousness". Duckworth stated that the cover fit their intention of something that would also be recognizable in a digital format, "small icons that go on your phone or iPod".

Turner compared the Metallica project with a campaign they did for Coca-Cola, as both approaches went down to "stripping things back down to what the brand was originally and the other part was adding a fresh new approach." The original Metallica logo was brought back to demonstrate how the band was trying to restore their old identity, while the cover was primarily white to contrast how the color is hardly used in the metal genre. Given the band wanted the physical release to be memorable to ensure it still had value in an age where audiences were purchasing more digital music, the original digipak featuring a layered die cut, where each page of the booklet resembled a layer of dirt being thrown on the coffin. Death Magnetic was issued on vinyl in a special box set, and also had a deluxe edition shaped like a coffin, bundled along with an additional disc full of demos, a making-of DVD, an exclusive T-shirt, guitar picks, a flag and a fold-out poster.

== Release and promotion ==
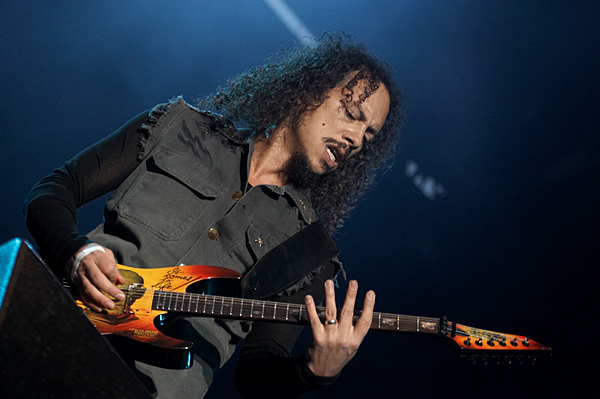
Hammett performing live in 2007

In January 2008, a statement was made by Stereo Warning that the album would be delayed until September 2008, The album, which was completed on August 10, 2008, was released on September 12 in the United States and issued in a variety of different packages.

On September 2, a French record store began selling copies of Death Magnetic, nearly two weeks ahead of its scheduled worldwide release date, which resulted in the album being made prematurely available on peer-to-peer clients. This prompted the band's UK distributor, Vertigo Records, to officially release the album two days ahead of schedule, on September 12. Ulrich, who was questioned about the leak on a San Francisco radio station, responded,

We're ten days from release. I mean, from here, we're golden. If this thing leaks all over the world today or tomorrow, happy days. Happy days. Trust me. Ten days out and it hasn't fallen off the truck yet? Everybody's happy. It's 2008 and it's part of how it is these days, so it's fine. We're happy.

He later told USA Today,

By 2008 standards, that's a victory. If you'd told me six months ago that our record wouldn't leak until 10 days out, I would have signed up for that. We made a great record, and people seem to be getting off on it way more than anyone expected.

During their Escape from the Studio '06 tour, Metallica debuted two songs. "The New Song" debuted on the European leg in Berlin, Germany on June 6, 2006. The song, as performed, is approximately eight minutes long. The title was rumored to be "Death Is Not the End" as Hetfield repeatedly sings the line throughout the song. This song would appear again in multiple Fly on the Wall videos on the Mission: Metallica website, showing the band partway through the song's recording, as noted by the slower tempo and lack of lyrics. "The Other New Song", (which was later named "Vulturous") debuted on August 12, 2006, in Tokyo, and is much shorter, taking just below four minutes to perform. To the surprise of fans, Metallica played "The Other New Song" once again on June 29, 2007, in Bilbao, Spain. Although neither of the "New Songs" appear on the album themselves, "The End of the Line" and "All Nightmare Long" both contain elements of "The New Song".

On August 9, 2008, Metallica debuted the first album track, "Cyanide", at Ozzfest, in Dallas, Texas and was performed again on August 20, 2008, in Dublin, Ireland. On August 22, at the Leeds Festival, they debuted the first single, "The Day That Never Comes".

On July 31, 2009, it was announced on Metallica.com that the band felt that the song "My Apocalypse" was in need of an introduction when played live to "set the mood". The statement on Metallica.com reads, "We've been enjoying playing 'My Apocalypse' out here on the road but felt like it could use something extra. We decided that it needed a cool intro to set the mood so James wrote one. Check out and enjoy this free download ... and make sure you learn it for singing along at a future show!" The approximately minute-long introduction is available as a free MP3 download. The song had originally been debuted live on March 25, 2009, at the LG Arena in Birmingham, United Kingdom.

On the day of the release FMQB radio broadcast The World Premiere of Death Magnetic, which was heard on more than 175 stations across the United States and Canada. The live program from Metallica HQ featured all four members of Metallica talking with Foo Fighters frontman Dave Grohl and drummer Taylor Hawkins. Originally scheduled for a 90-minute broadcast, the show ended after two hours.

=== Guitar Hero ===
Alongside the release of the album, it was released as downloadable content (DLC) for Guitar Hero III: Legends of Rock. This content would later be optimized for external use in Guitar Hero World Tour, Guitar Hero: Metallica (although "All Nightmare Long" was included on the in-game setlist), Guitar Hero 5, Band Hero, and Guitar Hero: Warriors of Rock.

The Guitar Hero DLC had two versions of the instrumental track "Suicide & Redemption". The versions differed by the guitar solo performed on the song: one version had a solo performed by Hetfield, the other a solo by Hammett. The tracks were titled according to the solo they contained, with the Hetfield version named "Suicide & Redemption J.H." and the Hammett version named "Suicide & Redemption K.H."

Due to technical restrictions, the Wii version of Guitar Hero: World Tour only could hold the three shortest songs of the eleven: "Broken, Beat & Scarred", "Cyanide" and "My Apocalypse". These songs also appear on the Wii and PS2 versions of Guitar Hero: Metallica as bonus songs instead of DLC. The eight remaining tracks (including both versions of "Suicide & Redemption") were released on November 24, 2009, as DLC for Guitar Hero 5 and Band Hero for Wii.

=== Tour ===
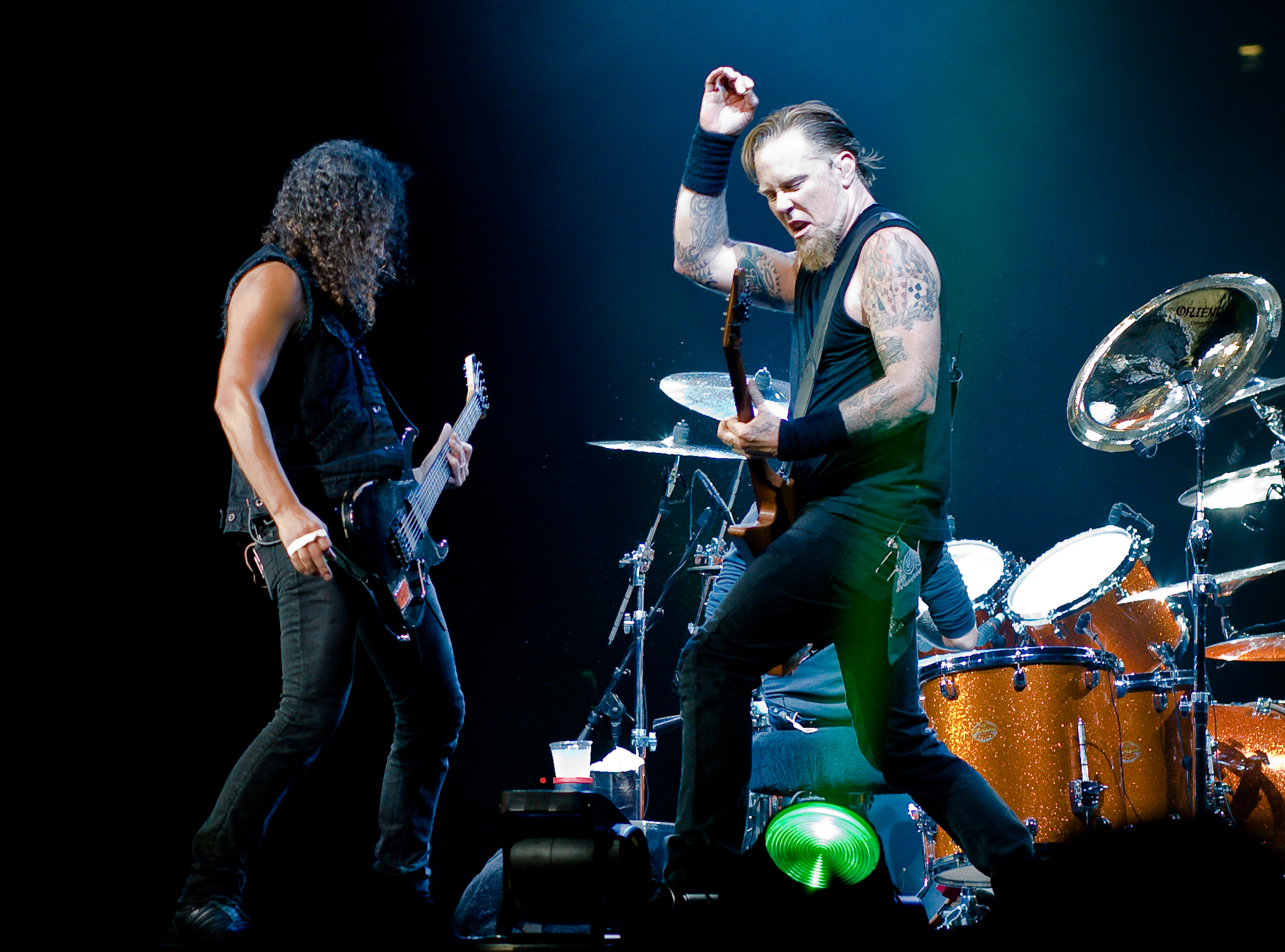
Kirk Hammett and James Hetfield performing in London in 2008

Metallica promoted Death Magnetic with the World Magnetic Tour, which started on October 21, 2008, in Phoenix, Arizona. The North American leg finished in February 2009 and was followed by European concerts, interrupted only by a surprise gig at the South by Southwest festival in Austin, Texas, to promote the video game Guitar Hero: Metallica. A second North American leg, prioritizing markets missed by the original concerts, began in September. The tour returned to both continents while also extending to Latin America, Israel, Japan and Oceania in 2010, ending on November 21 in Melbourne, Australia. The 2010 Sonisphere Festival headlined by Metallica had them for the first time accompanied by the rest of the "Big Four of thrash metal", Slayer, Megadeth and Anthrax, and the concert where all bands played together for one song was released theatrically and on home video as The Big Four: Live from Sofia, Bulgaria. Metallica also released in November 2009 two video albums out of World Magnetic Tour performances that year, Orgullo, Pasión, y Gloria: Tres Noches en la Ciudad de México featuring three Mexico City concerts in June, and Français Pour une Nuit with a concert in the French town of Nîmes in July.

== Critical reception ==
Professional ratings
Aggregate scores
Source	Rating
Metacritic	78/100
Review scores
Source	Rating
AllMusic	4/5 stars
Blender	4/5 stars
Consequence	4.5/5 stars
Entertainment Weekly	B+
The Guardian	4/5 stars
Los Angeles Times	3/4 stars
NME	8/10
Pitchfork	4.9/10
Rolling Stone	4/5 stars
Uncut	4/5 stars

But if you ignore the lyrics, Death Magnetic sounds more like it's about coming back to life. Everything comes together on the fan-favorite-to-be "Broken, Beat and Scarred", which manages to channel the full force of Metallica behind a positive message: "What don't kill ya make ya more strong", Hetfield sings, with enough power to make the cliché feel fresh. The aphorism he paraphrases happens to come from Nietzsche's Twilight of the Idols, which is subtitled How to Philosophize With a Hammer. Metallica's philosophizing may get shaky — but long may that hammer strike.

— Review by Rolling Stone, 2008

In a 2007 interview with Rolling Stone, ex-Guns N' Roses drummer Matt Sorum described his impressions of the unfinished songs:

Lars is a good friend of mine. He played me the demos from San Francisco, and I turned and looked at him and I said, 'Master that shit and put it out.' It's ridiculous. The demos were sick. Eight-minute songs, all these tempo changes, crazy fast. It's like, 'Dude, don't get slower when you get older, but don't get faster!? How are you gonna play this live?' And then me and Lars were out partying all night, and he had to go in the studio the next day and do this stupid like nine- or ten-minute song, and I was laughing at him—because he played me the demo of it, and it was [sings really fast drum part], so fast. I called him, and said, 'Dude, how are you feeling?' He was like, 'Dude, I'm hurting.' They're cutting everything to tape, no fuckin' Pro Tools—live, no clicks.

The album's first single, "The Day That Never Comes", was described by BBC Music as the closest thing to a ballad on the album. Rock Sound has also compared it to Thin Lizzy. The band has abandoned the solo-free approach that they followed on St. Anger, returning to complex, multi-layered arrangements such as those typically found on the band's fourth album ...And Justice for All.

Death Magnetic has been praised by fans as well as critics as a comeback for Metallica after the widely panned St. Anger. Thrash Hits was one of the first websites, along with The Quietus, to comment on Death Magnetic, claiming "it is a vast improvement on 2003 album St Anger". Metal Hammer noted Death Magnetic's "sharp riffs" and "uncharacteristic bouncing grooves", and favorably compares the band's sound on the album to bands like Slayer, Led Zeppelin and Rage Against the Machine. Dream Theater drummer Mike Portnoy has praised the album, saying "Death Magnetic is hands down the best Metallica album in 20 years. This is the CD I've been waiting for them to make since ...And Justice for All. And thumbs up to them for doing the first real Metallica instrumental in 20 years since 'To Live Is to Die'. Welcome back, boys."

While Metallica was on the first leg of their 2008 tour in Europe, a third party at their management Q Prime demanded that media impressions and blogs commenting on the album be taken down from their website for reasons that were not explained to the band. However, when the band learned of this, they were upset and Ulrich re-posted many of the links along with other reactions to the new album, along with an apology to those whose links had been removed from Metallica's website.

Reviews for the album have been mostly positive. AllMusic's Stephen Thomas Erlewine stated the album was like "hearing Metallica sound like Metallica again". Other positive reviews come from publications like The Guardian, who say that the album is "the strongest material the band have written in 20 years", and Uncut, declaring that "like all the best heavy rock albums, it suspends your disbelief, demands your attention and connects directly with your inner adolescent." BBC Music's Chris Jones felt that Hetfield's lyrics had become "the channel of his post-therapy angst". The Observer stated "it's a joy to have these gnarled veterans back to reinforce the sheer visceral thrill of timeless heavy metal".

On September 15, 2008, after a reviewer for Swedish daily Sydsvenskan admitted that he preferred a shortened mix of Death Magnetic to the official release, a scheduled interview was duly canceled by Universal Music Sweden. Its president, Per Sundin said:

The reviewer is referring to a BitTorrent where someone has altered the original songs. The reviewer explains exactly where one should go in order to download the file that totally infringes on a copyright. It's not only an illegal file, but an altered file. The reviewer also writes that this is how the album should have sounded. File-sharing of music is illegal. Period. There's nothing to discuss. That fact—that Sydsvenskan has a writer that has downloaded this music illegally and then makes mention of an illegal site in his review—is totally unacceptable to us.

=== Compression ===
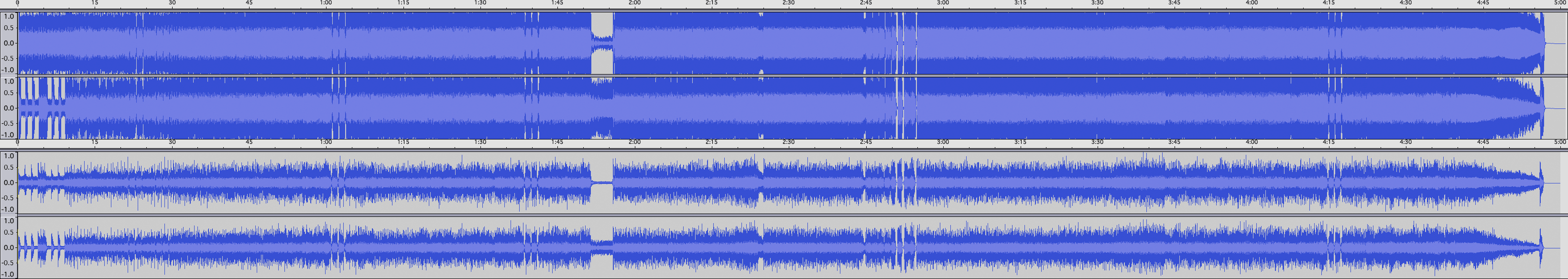
As this waveform shows, the CD version of Death Magnetic (top) is far more compressed (less dynamic) than the Guitar Hero downloadable release (bottom).

The album has been criticized for having compromised sound quality, due to an excessively compressed dynamic range, leading to audible distortion. Sean Michaels of The Guardian explains that this is "a result of the 'loudness war'—an ongoing industry effort to make recordings as loud as possible". A Rolling Stone article states that Rubin was "overseeing mixes in Los Angeles while the band is in Europe, headlining shows" and only communicated with him by conference calls.

Fans have noted that these sonic problems are not present in the Guitar Hero version of the album, where the guitars, bass, drums, and vocals are presented separately due to the mechanics of the game. The tracks were sent to the game publishers prior to being compressed. As a result, fans have shared "Guitar Hero" versions of the album. MusicRadar and Rolling Stone attribute a quote to the album's mastering engineer Ted Jensen in which he claims that "mixes were already brick-walled before they arrived" for mastering and cite a petition from fans to remix or remaster the album.

Metallica and Rubin initially declined to comment, while the band's co-manager Cliff Burnstein stated that complainers were in a minority and that response to the album had otherwise been "overwhelmingly positive". Ulrich later confirmed in an interview with Blender, that some creative control regarding the album's production had been transferred to Rubin but also stressed his satisfaction with the final product.

In 2015, the album was re-released on iTunes with a new "Mastered for iTunes" mastering which features an improved dynamic range and lack of distortion. Digital downloads from Metallica's official website all use the "Mastered for iTunes" version.

=== Accolades ===
Death Magnetic and its songs were nominated for five Grammy Awards at the 51st Grammy Awards on February 8, 2009, including Best Rock Album and Best Rock Instrumental Performance for "Suicide & Redemption", winning Best Metal Performance for "My Apocalypse". Rick Rubin also received the award for Producer of the Year, Non-Classical, and art directors Bruce Duckworth, David Turner & Sarah Moffat were awarded Best Recording Package. "The Unforgiven III" was also nominated for Best Hard Rock Performance at the 52nd Grammy Awards. Death Magnetic was awarded Best Album in the 2009 Kerrang! Awards.

At the 2008 Metal Storm Awards, the album won Best Heavy Metal Album and Biggest Surprise. In January 2009, it won a Swedish Metal Award for Best International Album.

Accolades for Death Magnetic
Publication	Country	Accolade	Year	Rank
Q	UK	50 Best Albums of the Year	2008	No. 25
Uncut	UK	50 Best Albums of 2008	2008	No. 44
Time	U.S.	Top 10 Albums of 2008	2008	No. 3
Revolver	U.S.	The 20 Best Albums of 2008	2008	No. 1
Rolling Stone	U.S.	Best Albums of 2008	2008	No. 9
Metal Edge	U.S.	50 Best Albums of 2008	2008	No. 2
Metal Hammer	UK	Critics' 50 Top Albums of 2008	2008	No. 1
Kerrang!	UK	Albums of the Year 2008	2008	No. 1
Metal Maniacs	U.S.	20 Metal Albums of 2008	2008	No. 20

== Commercial performance ==
Death Magnetic debuted at No. 1 on the Billboard 200, selling 490,000 copies in just three days of availability. It is the band's fifth consecutive studio album to debut at No. 1, making Metallica the first band to have five consecutive studio album releases to do so. The album marked the highest first week sales for the group since 1996's Load.

According to the September 27, 2008, issue of Billboard, Death Magnetic landed at No. 1 on the following ten charts: Billboard 200, Billboard Comprehensive Albums, Top Rock Albums, Top Hard Rock Albums, Top Modern Rock/Alternative Albums, Top Digital Albums, Top Internet Albums, Top European Albums, Tastemakers. "The Day That Never Comes" topped the Hot Mainstream Rock Tracks chart. The album stayed at No. 1 for three consecutive weeks on the Billboard 200, and spent 50 consecutive weeks on said chart. Internationally, it peaked at No. 1 in 34 countries, including Ireland, the UK, Canada and Australia.

In addition, nearly 60,000 copies were sold digitally, making it debut at No. 1 on the Digital Album chart. The album debuted at No. 1 on the UK albums chart after three days of availability, selling 75,164 copies. It remained at No. 1 for two weeks and has sold over 150,000 copies to date. In Canada, Death Magnetic debuted at No. 1 on the Canadian Albums Chart. It sold 81,000 copies in its first week, making it the second best-selling debut album of 2008 in Canada. It remained the No. 1 album for four consecutive weeks. The album was certified 4× platinum in Canada in October 2009.

In Australia, Death Magnetic was the fastest selling album of 2008, selling 55,877 copies in its first full week of release. Death Magnetic was Australia's highest-selling record in one week since Australian Idol winner Damien Leith's The Winner's Journey, in December 2006. The same success was repeated in Germany, where Death Magnetic has become the fastest selling album of 2008. Within the first three days of the album's release, Death Magnetic sold over 100,000 copies and has been certified platinum. According to reports, Death Magnetic is outselling competitors in Russia and Turkey, two countries which do not have an official album chart.

In Finland, during the second week of January 2009, Death Magnetic jumped eighteen spots back up to No. 1 on that country's album charts within one week.

Death Magnetic was certified 2× platinum (two million units sold) by the RIAA on June 28, 2010. As of March 2023, the album has sold 2,100,000 copies in the United States.

== Track listing ==
All lyrics are written by James Hetfield; all music is composed by Hetfield, Lars Ulrich, Kirk Hammett and Robert Trujillo.

Death Magnetic track listing
No.	Title	Length
1.	"That Was Just Your Life"	7:10
2.	"The End of the Line"	7:50
3.	"Broken, Beat & Scarred"	6:25
4.	"The Day That Never Comes"	7:55
5.	"All Nightmare Long"	8:01
6.	"Cyanide"	6:41
7.	"The Unforgiven III"	7:47
8.	"The Judas Kiss"	8:02
9.	"Suicide & Redemption" (instrumental)	9:57
10.	"My Apocalypse"	5:01
Total length:		74:54

=== Deluxe edition ===
The deluxe edition of the album included a bonus CD titled Demo Magnetic, which consisted of demo versions of the tracks on the album with working titles, and a bonus DVD depicting the making of the album.

Demo Magnetic
No.	Title	Length
1.	"Hi Guy" ("That Was Just Your Life")	7:11
2.	"Neinteen" ("The End of the Line")	7:35
3.	"Black Squirrel" ("Broken, Beat & Scarred")	6:13
4.	"Casper" ("The Day That Never Comes")	8:15
5.	"Flamingo" ("All Nightmare Long")	7:59
6.	"German Soup" ("Cyanide")	6:31
7.	"UN3" ("The Unforgiven III")	7:50
8.	"Gymbag" ("The Judas Kiss")	7:55
9.	"K2LU" ("Suicide & Redemption"; instrumental)	9:30
10.	"Ten" ("My Apocalypse")	5:18
Total length:		74:17

=== Formats ===
- Experience 2

A physical copy of the Death Magnetic CD.

- Experience 4

A box set of Death Magnetic on five 180-gram vinyl LP records, with five individual sleeves and a Mission: Metallica lithograph. This set was limited to 5,000 copies; 50 limited-edition copies in white vinyl were also later released.

- The Box Magnetic

A collector's edition white coffin-shaped box which includes the deluxe edition of Death Magnetic, along with additional "making of" footage not on the bonus DVD, an exclusive T-shirt with the Death Magnetic logo, a flag, guitar picks, a backstage pass, a fold-out coffin-shaped poster with the members of Metallica and a collector's credit card with a code for a free download of a performance in Europe in September. This set was limited to 2,000 copies.

== Personnel ==
Metallica

- James Hetfield – rhythm guitar, vocals, guitar solo on "Suicide & Redemption"
- Lars Ulrich – drums
- Kirk Hammett – lead guitar
- Robert Trujillo – bass guitar

Additional musicians

- David Campbell – orchestration on "The Unforgiven III"

Production

- Rick Rubin – production
- Greg Fidelman – engineering, mixing, recording
- Andrew Scheps – mixing
- Mike Gillies – additional recording
- Ted Jensen – mastering
- Dan Monti – digital editing

== Charts ==
=== Weekly charts ===
Weekly chart performance for Death Magnetic
Chart (2008)	Peak position
Argentine Albums (CAPIF)	1
Australian Albums (ARIA)	1
Austrian Albums (Ö3 Austria)	1
Belgian Albums (Ultratop Flanders)	1
Belgian Albums (Ultratop Wallonia)	2
Brazilian Albums (ABPD)	4
Canadian Albums (Billboard)	1
Croatian International Albums (HDU)	1
Czech Albums (ČNS IFPI)	1
Danish Albums (Hitlisten)	1
Dutch Albums (Album Top 100)	1
European Albums (Billboard)	1
Finnish Albums (Suomen virallinen lista)	1
French Albums (SNEP)	1
German Albums (Offizielle Top 100)	1
Greek Albums (IFPI)	1
Hungarian Albums (MAHASZ)	2
Irish Albums (IRMA)	1
Italian Albums (FIMI)	1
Japanese Albums (Oricon)	3
Mexican Albums (Top 100 Mexico)	1
New Zealand Albums (RMNZ)	1
Norwegian Albums (VG-lista)	1
Polish Albums (ZPAV)	1
Portuguese Albums (AFP)	1
Russian Albums (Tophit)	14
Scottish Albums (Official Charts)	2
Slovenian Albums (IFPI)	1
Spanish Albums (Promusicae)	2
Swedish Albums (Sverigetopplistan)	1
Swiss Albums (Schweizer Hitparade)	1
Taiwanese Albums (Five Music)	7
UK Albums (Official Charts)	1
US Billboard 200	1
US Top Rock Albums (Billboard)	1
US Top Alternative Albums (Billboard)	1
US Top Hard Rock Albums (Billboard)	1

=== Year-end charts ===
2008 year-end chart performance for Death Magnetic
Chart (2008)	Position
Australian Albums (ARIA)	8
Austrian Albums (Ö3 Austria)	4
Belgian Albums (Ultratop Flanders)	11
Belgian Albums (Ultratop Wallonia)	59
Canadian Albums (Billboard)	4
Croatian Combined Albums (HDU)	21
Danish Albums (Hitlisten)	7
Dutch Albums (Album Top 100)	14
European Albums (Billboard)	8
French Albums (SNEP)	46
German Albums (Offizielle Top 100)	9
Greek Albums (IFPI)	23
Greek Foreign Albums (IFPI)	3
Hungarian Albums (MAHASZ)	15
Italian Albums (FIMI)	35
Japanese Albums (Oricon)	98
Mexican Albums (Top 100 Mexico)	16
New Zealand Albums (RMNZ)	7
Swedish Albums (Sverigetopplistan)	3
Swedish Albums & Compilations (Sverigetopplistan)	5
Swiss Albums (Schweizer Hitparade)	10
UK Albums (OCC)	53
US Billboard 200	16
US Top Rock Albums (Billboard)	6
Worldwide Albums (IFPI)	5

2009 year-end chart performance for Death Magnetic
Chart (2009)	Position
Belgian Albums (Ultratop Flanders)	85
Canadian Albums (Billboard)	41
European Albums (Billboard)	89
US Billboard 200	61
US Top Rock Albums (Billboard)	20

== Certifications and sales ==
Certifications and sales for Death Magnetic
Region	Certification	Certified units/sales
Argentina (CAPIF)	Platinum	40,000^{^}
Australia (ARIA)	2× Platinum	140,000^{^}
Belgium (BRMA)	Platinum	30,000^{*}
Brazil (Pro-Música Brasil)	Gold	30,000^{*}
Canada (Music Canada)	4× Platinum	320,000^{^}
Denmark (IFPI Danmark)	2× Platinum	60,000^{^}
Finland (Musiikkituottajat)	2× Platinum	79,415
France (SNEP)	Gold	75,000^{*}
GCC (IFPI Middle East)	Platinum	6,000^{*}
Germany (BVMI)	5× Gold	500,000^{‡}
Greece (IFPI Greece)	Platinum	15,000^{^}
Hungary (MAHASZ)	Platinum	6,000^{^}
Ireland (IRMA)	Platinum	15,000^{^}
Italy	—	60,000
Japan (RIAJ)	Gold	100,000^{^}
Mexico (AMPROFON)	Gold	40,000^{^}
New Zealand (RMNZ)	2× Platinum	30,000^{‡}
Norway	—	64,000
Poland (ZPAV)	Diamond	100,000^{‡}
Portugal (AFP)	Platinum	20,000^{^}
Russia (NFPF)	3× Platinum	60,000^{*}
Spain (Promusicae)	Gold	40,000^{^}
Sweden (GLF)	2× Platinum	80,000^{^}
Switzerland (IFPI Switzerland)	Platinum	30,000^{^}
Turkey (Mü-Yap)	Gold	5,000^{*}
United Kingdom (BPI)	Platinum	300,000 ^{‡} / 330,398
United States (RIAA)	2× Platinum	2,000,000 ^{^} / 2,100,000
Summaries
Europe (IFPI)	Platinum	1,000,000^{*}
^{*} Sales figures based on certification alone.^{^} Shipments figures based on certification alone.^{‡} Sales+streaming figures based on certification alone.

== Release history ==
Release dates and formats for Death Magnetic
Region	Date	Label	Format	Catalog ref
United Kingdom	September 12, 2008	Vertigo Records	Compact Disc, digipak, deluxe carton box, 2LP (33 rpm), 5LP box (45 rpm 180-gram vinyl)	1773726
Mexico	September 12, 2008	Universal Music	Compact Disc, Super Jewel Case	
Austria	September 12, 2008	Universal Music	Compact Disc	—
Colombia	September 12, 2008	Vertigo Records	Compact Disc	602517840201
Finland	September 12, 2008	Universal Music	Compact Disc, digipak, deluxe carton box	—
Germany	September 12, 2008	Universal Music	Compact Disc	—
Japan	September 12, 2008	Universal Music	Compact Disc, deluxe carton box	UICR-1077
United States	September 12, 2008	Warner Bros. Records	Compact Disc, deluxe carton box, 2LP (33 rpm), 5LP box (45 rpm 180-gram vinyl)	508732–2
Canada	September 12, 2008	Warner Music	Compact Disc, digipak	2–508732
Poland	September 12, 2008	Universal Music	Compact Disc, deluxe carton box	—
Portugal	September 12, 2008	Universal Music	Compact Disc, deluxe carton box	00602517737280
Switzerland	September 12, 2008	Universal Music	Compact Disc, deluxe carton box	—
Europe	September 12, 2008	Universal Music	Compact Disc, Coffin Box Set, Deluxe CD Carton Case	00602517737280
India	September 12, 2008	Universal Music	Compact Disc, digipak, coffin box set	602517737266
Australia	September 13, 2008	Universal Music	Compact Disc, limited edition die-cut deluxe digipak	00602517737280
Various	June 22, 2015	Blackened Recordings	Download (Mastered for iTunes)	—
