= Broken, Beat & Scarred =

- Disc 1 cover

Single by Metallica

from the album Death Magnetic
- B-side: "Broken, Beat & Scarred" (live)
- Released: April 3, 2009
- Length: 6:25
- Label: Warner Bros.; Mercury
- Composers: James Hetfield; Lars Ulrich; Kirk Hammett; Robert Trujillo
- Lyricist: James Hetfield
- Producer: Rick Rubin

Metallica singles chronology
"All Nightmare Long" (2008)	"Broken, Beat & Scarred" (2009)	"The View" (2011)

Music video
- "Broken, Beat & Scarred" on YouTube

Alternative covers
- Disc 2 cover

Alternative cover
- Disc 3 cover

"Broken, Beat & Scarred" is a song by American heavy metal band Metallica, and the fourth and final single from their studio album Death Magnetic. It was released on April 3, 2009.

James Hetfield and Lars Ulrich argued at length over the title of this song. Hetfield said that he did not like the title, but Ulrich was "very adamant" that it should be called "Broken, Beat & Scarred".

On April 3, 2009, "Broken, Beat & Scarred" was released as a single in two formats, a digi-collectors edition and a maxi single.

== Music video ==
On March 26, 2009, the official video for "Broken, Beat & Scarred" premiered on the band's official website. The video features the band performing the song live in Fresno, California, in December 2008 accompanied by other clips of the band performing in Ontario, California, in December 2008 on the World Magnetic Tour. It was directed by Wayne Isham, who has previously worked with the band on several videos including Cunning Stunts.

== Incorrect credits ==
The CD maxi single, which was released in Australia, New Zealand, and Southeast Asia, was found to have incorrect information in the credits. The band said that no one from the band or their management had been able to see the artwork before it was released, and it was the fault of the record company. The band said that the singles would be pulled from the stores and another batch was made available. They described the old version as a collector's item for fans who had already bought it.

== Track listing ==
International single part 1
No.	Title	Length
1.	"Broken, Beat & Scarred"	6:26
2.	"Broken, Beat & Scarred" (live)	7:26
3.	"The End of the Line" (live)	7:52

International single part 2
No.	Title	Length
1.	"Broken, Beat & Scarred"	6:26
2.	"Stone Cold Crazy" (live)	3:24
3.	"Of Wolf and Man" (live)	4:52

International single part 3 (DVD)
No.	Title	Length
1.	"Broken, Beat & Scarred" (video)	6:15
2.	"The Day That Never Comes" (video)	8:25
3.	"Death Magnetic EPK/Promo Reel"	17:25

Australian maxi single
No.	Title	Length
1.	"Broken, Beat & Scarred"	6:26
2.	"Broken, Beat & Scarred" (live)	7:26
3.	"The End of the Line" (live)	7:52
4.	"Stone Cold Crazy" (live)	3:24
5.	"Of Wolf and Man" (live)	4:52

- All live versions recorded at the O2 Arena, London on September 15, 2008, at the Death Magnetic release event.

== Personnel ==
Metallica

- James Hetfield – rhythm guitar, vocals
- Lars Ulrich – drums
- Kirk Hammett – lead guitar
- Robert Trujillo – bass guitar

Other personnel

- Rick Rubin – production

== Chart performance ==
Chart (2009)	Peak position
Australian ARIA Singles Chart	75
Austria Singles Top 75	74
Dutch Top 40	25
Finland Singles Chart	4
France Singles Top 100	36
German Singles Top 100	35
US Billboard European Hot 100	67
US Billboard Rock Songs	32
US Billboard Hot Mainstream Rock Tracks	15
US Billboard Heritage Rock	18

== Release details ==
Date	Country/region	Format
April 3, 2009	Europe (except France)	Digi-collector's edition
April 3, 2009	South America	CD maxi single
April 6, 2009	France	Digi-collectors edition
April 13, 2009	Southeast Asia	CD maxi single
April 13, 2009	Australia	CD maxi single
April 13, 2009	New Zealand	CD maxi single
