= The Day That Never Comes =

Single by Metallica

from the album Death Magnetic
- B-side: "No Remorse" (Live)
- Released: August 21, 2008
- Recorded: March 12, 2007 – May 11, 2008 in Los Angeles
- Genre: Thrash metal; heavy metal
- Length: 7:56
- Label: Warner Bros.; Mercury
- Composers: James Hetfield; Lars Ulrich; Kirk Hammett; Robert Trujillo
- Lyricist: James Hetfield
- Producer: Rick Rubin

Metallica singles chronology
"Some Kind of Monster" (2004)	"The Day That Never Comes" (2008)	"My Apocalypse" (2008)

Music video
- "The Day That Never Comes" on YouTube

"The Day That Never Comes" is a song by heavy metal band Metallica, and the lead single from their ninth studio album, Death Magnetic. The song was released to the radio and for digital download on August 21, 2008.

The working title of the song was "Casper", as shown in the Mission: Metallica videos and in Demo Magnetic.

This was their first single to feature their current bassist Robert Trujillo.

== Composition ==
Like previous ballads and downbeat songs by Metallica, it is the fourth track of the album. Rock Sound has also compared the song to the likes of Thin Lizzy. The intro starts out with clean guitars that carry into the verses, while the choruses are backed with heavily distorted guitars. The bridge speeds up gradually and eventually leads into fast-paced harmony between the guitars and a long guitar solo by Hammett, a build-up comparable to that of "One", "Welcome Home (Sanitarium)" and "Fade to Black". The ending of the song, like the previously mentioned ballads, is purely instrumental, featuring numerous solos and chord progressions.

== Music video ==
A music video for the song was filmed in rural Los Angeles County, California on July 31, 2008, directed by Danish filmmaker Thomas Vinterberg. It was premiered on the band's official page at midnight on September 1, 2008.

In the video, a Humvee carrying three U.S. Marines is struck by an improvised explosive device; though they survive, one Marine is wounded. Another Marine provides first aid, but the wounded Marine loses consciousness and is medevaced by a helicopter, leaving his fate unclear. Later, the Marine leads a squad on a patrol when they come across a man with a jumper cable and a woman in a chador next to a broken-down Yugo. Believing it is an ambush, the squad holds them at gunpoint and orders the woman out of the Yugo, but tensions rise when she approaches the Marine with her hands up. Though the squad fears she may be a suicide bomber, the Marine realizes they mean no harm and orders the squad to help push start the Yugo. As the man and woman leave in the repaired Yugo, the Marine stops to look at the sky. Scenes of the band performing in the desert are interspersed within the video.

== Concepts ==
On August 4, 2008, in an MTV interview, the song lyrics were said to tackle the subject of forgiveness and resentment. The band's drummer Lars Ulrich stated that the lyrics were inspired by a father-son relationship. The music video uses a different theme compared to the lyrics however, instead depicting a military conflict in the Middle East involving the United States (similar to the then-ongoing Iraq War and War in Afghanistan); despite this setting however, no political statement was intended from Metallica. Frontman James Hetfield spoke on the lyrics of the song and the difference between the song's lyrics, music video, and intended vision:

"That's the beauty, I think, of writing vague but powerful lyrics – that someone like a movie director can interpret it in his own way and obviously, someone creative is able to take the metaphors and apply them to whatever he needs in his own life," the frontman explained. "The main [theme of the video] is the human element of forgiveness and someone doing you wrong, you feeling resentment and you being able to see through that in the next situation that might be similar and not take your rage or resentment out on the next person and basically keep spreading the disease of that through life...The one thing that I wasn't keen on here was Metallica plugging into a modern war or a current event [that] might be construed as some sort of political statement on our part... There are so many celebrities that soapbox their opinions, and people believe it's more valid because they're popular. For us, people are people – you should all have your own opinion. We are hopefully putting the human element in what is an unfortunate part of life. There are people over there dealing with situations like this, and we're showing the human part of being there."

Lead guitarist Kirk Hammett and Ulrich also stated that the concept of the video deals with humanity and the relationships between human beings and how one's basic sense of humanity can override any sort of politicized situation.

== In popular culture ==
- "The Day That Never Comes" appears as part of the Death Magnetic album DLC for Guitar Hero III: Legends of Rock and it was later optimized to be used for Guitar Hero: World Tour, Guitar Hero: Metallica, Guitar Hero 5, Band Hero and Guitar Hero: Warriors of Rock.
- The song was used in the video game DJ Hero 2 mixed with Kanye West's "Love Lockdown."
- The song was featured in the end credits to the documentary Paradise Lost 3: Purgatory.

== Track listing ==
CD single
No.	Title	Writer(s)	Length
1.	"The Day That Never Comes"	James Hetfield; Lars Ulrich; Kirk Hammett; Robert Trujillo	7:56
2.	"No Remorse" (Live)	Hetfield; Ulrich	5:33

- "No Remorse" was recorded in Orlando, Florida in 2003.

== Personnel ==
Metallica

- James Hetfield – rhythm guitar, vocals, harmony guitar
- Lars Ulrich – drums
- Kirk Hammett – lead guitar
- Robert Trujillo – bass guitar

Production

- Rick Rubin – producer
- Ted Jensen – mastering
- Greg Fidelman – mixing
- Thomas Vinterberg – music video director

== Chart performance ==
The song debuted and peaked on Billboard's Hot 100 at number 31, giving the band their seventh top forty Hot 100 hit. It is also the band's highest-charting single on the Hot 100 since 1997's "The Memory Remains", which peaked at number 28. With less than four days of airplay, "The Day That Never Comes" debuted at number 7 on Billboard's Mainstream Rock Chart, giving Metallica their sixteenth top ten hit on the chart. The next week it rose to number 2 on the Mainstream Rock Chart. In its third week, it reached number one on the chart, the band's sixth song to top the chart, and first since 2000's "I Disappear". It also debuted at number 25 on Modern Rock Tracks, where it eventually peaked at number 5, giving the band their first top five hit on that chart. It debuted in the top ten on the Canadian Hot 100, at number 9.

"The Day That Never Comes" spent a total of nine weeks at number one on the Hot Mainstream Rock Chart with its seven consecutive weeks at the top spot and two consecutive weeks prior.

The song was very successful internationally as well. On August 24, 2008, the song entered the UK Singles Chart at number 36 and peaked at number 19. In Ireland, it reached number 14. On the Australian ARIA Charts, the song also reached the top twenty, at number 18. It reached the top ten in New Zealand, Denmark, Norway, Finland, and Sweden.

It was voted in at number 88 on the Triple J Hottest 100, 2008 which is Australia's largest annual music poll. It was their only track off Death Magnetic to poll in the list.

=== Weekly charts ===
Chart (2008)	Peak position
Australian Singles Chart	18
Austria Top 40 Charts	25
Belgium Singles Top 50	11
Canadian Hot 100	9
Denmark Singles Chart	3
Finland (Suomen virallinen lista)	1
Irish Singles Chart	14
Italian Singles Chart	15
Netherlands Mega Top 100	20
New Zealand Singles Chart	14
Norwegian Singles Chart	1
Portuguese National Top 50	6
Swedish Singles Chart	3
Triple J Hottest 100	88
Turkey Top 20 Chart	18
UK Singles Chart	19
European Hot 100	2
US Billboard Hot 100	31
US Billboard Hot Mainstream Rock Tracks	1
US Billboard Hot Modern Rock Tracks	5
Venezuela Pop Rock (Record Report)	4

=== Year-end charts ===
Chart (2008)	Position
Swedish Singles Chart	88

== Certifications ==
Region	Certification	Certified units/sales
Australia (ARIA)	Gold	35,000^{‡}
New Zealand (RMNZ)	Gold	15,000^{‡}
United States (RIAA)	Gold	500,000^{^}
^{^} Shipments figures based on certification alone.^{‡} Sales+streaming figures based on certification alone.
