= Fade to Black (Metallica song) =

1984 single by Metallica

Promotional single by Metallica

from the album Ride the Lightning
- Released: 1984
- Recorded: February 20 – March 14, 1984
- Studio: Sweet Silence (Copenhagen)
- Genre: Heavy metal
- Length: 6:55
- Label: Megaforce; Elektra
- Songwriters: James Hetfield; Lars Ulrich; Cliff Burton; Kirk Hammett
- Producers: Metallica; Flemming Rasmussen

Audio sample
- file; help

"Fade to Black" is a song and the first power ballad by the American heavy metal band Metallica, released as the first promotional single from their second studio album, Ride the Lightning (1984). The song was ranked as having the 24th-best guitar solo ever by Guitar World readers.

The song peaked at number 100 on Swiss Singles Chart in 2008. The song is certified 2× Platinum by the Recording Industry Association of America. In March 2023, Rolling Stone ranked "Fade to Black" at number 35 on their "100 Greatest Heavy Metal Songs of All Time" list.

== Background and composition ==
In an interview on the set of the production MTV Icon: Metallica in 2003, drummer Lars Ulrich recalls how he and vocalist/rhythm guitarist James Hetfield were "obsessed with death" at the time the album and song were produced. Hetfield later admitted that a break-in to their gear truck resulting in the loss of his favorite Marshall amplifier also contributed to the mood of the song.

The song's lyrics address suicidal feelings. It begins with an acoustic guitar introduction and becomes progressively heavier as the song goes on, similar to their future songs, "Welcome Home (Sanitarium)", "One", and "The Day That Never Comes". James Hetfield commented on the song in a 1991 interview with Guitar World:

That song was a big step for us. It was pretty much our first ballad, so we knew it would freak people out... Recording that song, I learned how frustrating acoustic guitar can be. You could hear every squeak, so I had to be careful. I wrote the song at a friend's house in New Jersey. I was pretty depressed at the time because our gear had just been stolen, and we had been thrown out of our manager's house for breaking shit and drinking his liquor cabinet dry. It's a suicide song, and we got a lot of flak for it, as if kids were killing themselves because of the song. But we also got hundreds of letters from kids telling us how they related to the song and that it made them feel better.

"Fade to Black" was released as a promotional single in 1984, through a phosphorescent green LP record.

== Track listing ==
Promotional vinyl 12"
No.	Title	Length
1.	"Fade to Black" (Vocal/LP Version)	6:57

== Personnel ==
Credits adapted from Ride The Lightning liner notes

- James Hetfield – rhythm guitar, acoustic guitar, vocals
- Lars Ulrich – drums
- Kirk Hammett – lead guitar
- Cliff Burton – bass

== Charts ==
Chart (2026)	Peak position
Greece International (IFPI)	65

== Certifications ==
Region	Certification	Certified units/sales
Australia (ARIA)	Platinum	70,000^{‡}
United Kingdom (BPI)	Silver	200,000^{‡}
United States (RIAA)	2× Platinum	2,000,000^{‡}
Streaming
Greece (IFPI Greece)	Gold	1,000,000^{†}
^{‡} Sales+streaming figures based on certification alone.^{†} Streaming-only figures based on certification alone.
