= All Nightmare Long =

2008 single by Metallica

- Disc 1 cover

Single by Metallica

from the album Death Magnetic
- B-side: "Wherever I May Roam" (Live)
- Released: December 15, 2008
- Recorded: 2007–2008
- Genre: Thrash metal
- Length: 7:58
- Label: Warner Bros.
- Composers: James Hetfield; Lars Ulrich; Kirk Hammett; Robert Trujillo
- Lyricist: James Hetfield
- Producer: Rick Rubin

Metallica singles chronology
"The Judas Kiss" (2008)	"All Nightmare Long" (2008)	"Broken, Beat & Scarred" (2009)

Music video
- "All Nightmare Long" on YouTube

Alternative covers
- Disc 2 cover

Alternative cover
- Disc 3 cover

"All Nightmare Long" is a song by American heavy metal band Metallica, released as the third single from their album Death Magnetic. The single was released on December 15, 2008. The song is in drop D tuning. It was nominated for the Kerrang! Award for Best Single.

== Music video ==
The music video, directed by Roboshobo (Robert Schober), debuted on December 7, 2008, on Metallica's official website and Yahoo! Video. The video, which does not feature the band, is an alternate history narrative done in grainy mockumentary style, depicting a sequence of fictional events following the historic 1908 Tunguska event, at which Soviet scientists discover spores of an extraterrestrial organism, a small harmless thing resembling an armored worm.

However, it turns out the incredibly hardy spores are able to reanimate dead tissue, and subjects turn violent sometime after exposure to the spores; a cartoon then shows the USSR adapting them as a bioweapon and scattering them from balloons in a preemptive strike against the U.S., causing a localized zombie apocalypse before intervening militarily to distribute humanitarian aid. At the end of the cartoon, a hybrid U.S.–USSR flag is raised in the now-Soviet-ruled America, and in 1972, a headless corpse is shown breaching containment and escaping from a Soviet biowarfare lab.

=== Video origin ===
Initially, in a video on the website Metclub.com, Kirk Hammett explained the origins of the video. He claimed to have bought the film from a fan for $5 in Russia and soon forgot about it. After digging it up and watching the animated film, he said that he was fascinated by it, researched about its background, and asked a friend's Russian girlfriend to translate parts of it. Following this, Hammett had supposedly been trying to incorporate the film into one of the band's music videos. However, as it was later revealed, Hammett's story was a fake to produce hype about the video: the film was not made in Russia and Hammett did not actually buy it there. Rather, as the video's director Roboshobo stated in an interview, the live action segments (including the ending) were specially shot to look like excerpts of old Russian documentary footage. The video bears similarities to the underground documentary Experiments in the Revival of Organisms, where animal experimentation to produce life extension is depicted. The subtitles and everything else included in the video are part of its concept. The word "Тунгусский" ("Tunguska") appears several times with different typos ("тунгузский", "тунзский", "тчнгзский").

== Lyrical meaning ==
In an interview, James Hetfield commented on the song's lyrical meaning:

"I like to keep it as vague as possible, so it can plug into your life. It almost didn't make it. The chorus is a leftover from St. Anger. It was an attempt to get back to the H. P. Lovecraft mythos with Thing That Should Not Be, Call of Ktulu.[sic] This was about the Hounds of Tindalos, which was another crazy mindfuck about these wolves that hunt through their nightmares and the only way you can get away from them is stay with angels. You can't even escape through sleep."

== Release versions ==
The single is available in a three-disc collectors set. The first disc was released as a digipack to store the remaining two discs with the album version of "All Nightmare Long", along with the songs "Wherever I May Roam" and "Master of Puppets", recorded live in Berlin at the Death Magnetic release bash at the O_{2} Arena in September 2008. The second disc also has the studio version of "All Nightmare Long", along with the songs "Blackened" and "Seek & Destroy", also recorded at the Berlin O_{2} Arena. The third disc is a DVD, which, along with the album version of the song as audio, includes a ten-minute-long mini-documentary about the bands' day in Berlin, along with twenty minutes' worth of live tracks from that night's album release party, as well a fifteen-minute-long movie from the tuning room at the Rock im Park.

== In pop culture ==
- "All Nightmare Long" appeared in the documentary McConkey.
- WWE used the song as the official theme for the 2008 pay-per-view event No Mercy, and in the video package to promote the Winner Takes All match for the WWE and Universal Championship at Wrestlemania 38.
- American Dad! uses the song in the season 12 episode "The Life Aquatic with Steve Smith".
- "All Nightmare Long" appeared in the Tony Hawk's Pro Skater 3 DLC pack for Tony Hawk's Pro Skater HD.

== Track listing ==
International Single Part 1
No.	Title	Length
1.	"All Nightmare Long"	7:58
2.	"Wherever I May Roam" (Live)	6:37
3.	"Master of Puppets" (Live)	8:20

International Single Part 2
No.	Title	Length
1.	"All Nightmare Long"	7:58
2.	"Blackened" (Live)	6:29
3.	"Seek & Destroy" (Live)	7:45

International Single Part 3 (DVD)
No.	Title	Length
1.	"All Nightmare Long"	7:58
2.	"Berlin Magnetic" (Documentary)	31:51
3.	"Rock Im Park "Containter" Rehearsal"	14:46

Japanese EP
No.	Title	Length
1.	"All Nightmare Long"	7:58
2.	"Wherever I May Roam" (Live)	6:37
3.	"Master of Puppets" (Live)	8:20
4.	"Blackened" (Live)	6:29
5.	"Seek & Destroy" (Live)	7:45

Australian single
No.	Title	Length
1.	"All Nightmare Long"	7:58
2.	"Master of Puppets" (Live)	8:20
3.	"Blackened" (Live)	6:29
4.	"Seek & Destroy" (Live)	7:45

== Personnel ==
Metallica

- James Hetfield – rhythm guitar, vocals
- Lars Ulrich – drums
- Kirk Hammett – lead guitar
- Robert Trujillo – bass guitar

Production

- Rick Rubin – producing
- Ted Jensen – mastering
- Greg Fidelman – mixing

== Charts ==
Chart performance for "All Nightmare Long"
Chart (2009)	Peak position
Australia (ARIA)	90
Austria (Ö3 Austria Top 40)	51
Belgium (Ultratop 50 Flanders)	27
Belgium (Ultratop 50 Wallonia)	18
Finland (Suomen virallinen lista)	11
France (SNEP)	55
Germany (GfK)	15
Netherlands (Single Top 100)	7
Spain (Promusicae)	6
Sweden (Sverigetopplistan)	44
US Hot Rock & Alternative Songs (Billboard)	28
US Mainstream Rock (Billboard)	9
