= Live Shit: Binge & Purge =

Live album box set by Metallica
- Released: November 23, 1993
- Recorded: August 29, 1989 – March 2, 1993
- Venue: Seattle Coliseum (Seattle); San Diego Sports Arena (San Diego); Palacio de los Deportes (Mexico City)
- Genres: Thrash metal; heavy metal
- Length: 2:20:35 (Seattle performance); 3:19:09 (San Diego performance); 2:57:06 (Mexico City performance); 8:34:39 (full box set)
- Label: Elektra
- Producers: James Hetfield; Lars Ulrich

Metallica chronology
Metallica (1991)	Live Shit: Binge & Purge (1993)	Load (1996)

Metallica video chronology
A Year and a Half in the Life of Metallica (1992)	Live Shit: Binge & Purge (1993)	Cunning Stunts (1998)

Professional ratings
Review scores
Source	Rating
AllMusic	3.5/5 stars
Collector's Guide to Heavy Metal	8/10
Entertainment Weekly	B
The Rolling Stone Album Guide	2/5 stars

Live Shit: Binge & Purge is the first live album by the American heavy metal band Metallica, released in a box set format on November 23, 1993. The initial pressings contained three CDs or two cassette tapes, featuring songs from concerts in Mexico City during the Nowhere Else to Roam tour, as well as three VHS tapes, one of them with a concert in Seattle from the Damaged Justice Tour from 1989, and the other two with a concert in San Diego from the Wherever We May Roam Tour from 1992, split in two parts. It was originally packaged as a cardboard box designed to resemble a typical tour equipment transport box. In addition to the audio and video media, the box featured extra bonus material, including a booklet with photos, typical tour correspondence exchanged by the band and their management, internal documents, and handwritten notes; a recreated copy of an access pass to the "Snakepit" section of the tour stage; and a cardboard drawing/airbrush stencil of the "Scary Guy" logo. Live Shit: Binge & Purge has been certified 21× platinum by the RIAA as a long-form video format.

When the set was reissued in a 3-CD / 2-DVD format (with the San Diego concert in one DVD), the box was replaced with a jewel case format. The booklet that was included in the initial set was made available as DVD-ROM content.

== Track listing ==
=== Audio CDs ===
Recorded at the Palacio de los Deportes, Mexico City, Mexico, on February 25, 26, 27, and March 1 and 2, 1993.

Disc one
No.	Title	Writer(s)	Length
1.	"The Ecstasy of Gold/Enter Sandman"	Ennio Morricone/James Hetfield, Lars Ulrich, Kirk Hammett	7:28
2.	"Creeping Death"	Hetfield, Ulrich, Cliff Burton, Hammett	7:28
3.	"Harvester of Sorrow"	Hetfield, Ulrich	7:19
4.	"Welcome Home (Sanitarium)"	Hetfield, Ulrich, Hammett	6:39
5.	"Sad but True"	Hetfield, Ulrich	6:07
6.	"Of Wolf and Man"	Hetfield, Ulrich, Hammett	6:22
7.	"The Unforgiven"	Hetfield, Ulrich, Hammett	6:48
8.	"Justice Medley": "Eye of the Beholder"; "The Frayed Ends of Sanity"; "...And Justice for All"; "Blackened"	Hetfield, Ulrich, Hammett; Hetfield, Ulrich, Hammett; Hetfield, Ulrich, Hammett; Hetfield, Ulrich, Newsted	9:38
9.	"Solos (bass/guitar) (My Friend of Misery/Dazed and Confused (Led Zeppelin))"		18:49
Total length:			76:34

Disc two
No.	Title	Writer(s)	Length
1.	"Through the Never"	Hetfield, Ulrich, Hammett	3:47
2.	"For Whom the Bell Tolls"	Hetfield, Ulrich, Burton	5:48
3.	"Fade to Black"	Hetfield, Ulrich, Burton, Hammett	7:12
4.	"Master of Puppets"	Hetfield, Ulrich, Burton, Hammett	4:35
5.	"Seek & Destroy"	Hetfield, Ulrich	18:08
6.	"Whiplash"	Hetfield, Ulrich	5:34
Total length:			45:04

Disc three
No.	Title	Writer(s)	Length
1.	"Nothing Else Matters"	Hetfield, Ulrich	6:22
2.	"Wherever I May Roam"	Hetfield, Ulrich	6:33
3.	"Am I Evil?" (originally performed by Diamond Head)	Sean Harris, Brian Tatler	5:42
4.	"Last Caress" (originally performed by the Misfits)	Glenn Danzig	1:25
5.	"One"	Hetfield, Ulrich	10:27
6.	"So What?/Battery" ("So What?" originally performed by Anti-Nowhere League)	Nick Kulmer, Chris Exall, Clive Blake / Hetfield, Ulrich	10:05
7.	"The Four Horsemen"	Hetfield, Ulrich, Dave Mustaine	6:08
8.	"Motorbreath"	Hetfield	3:14
9.	"Stone Cold Crazy" (originally performed by Queen)	Freddie Mercury, Brian May, Roger Taylor, John Deacon	5:32
Total length:			55:28

=== VHS/DVD ===
==== San Diego ====
Recorded at the San Diego Sports Arena, San Diego, California, on January 13 and 14, 1992.

===== VHS one/DVD one =====
No.	Title	Length
1.	"20 Min. MetalliMovie"	19:56
2.	"The Ecstasy of Gold/Enter Sandman"	7:23
3.	"Creeping Death"	7:45
4.	"Harvester of Sorrow"	6:55
5.	"Welcome Home (Sanitarium)"	6:59
6.	"Sad But True"	6:35
7.	"Wherever I May Roam"	6:57
8.	"Bass solo (My Friend of Misery)/Orion Jam"	10:48
9.	"Through the Never"	4:29
10.	"The Unforgiven"	7:54
11.	"Justice Medley" ("Eye of the Beholder"/"Blackened"/"The Frayed Ends of Sanity"/"...And Justice for All"/"Blackened")"	10:16
12.	"Drum solo and drum battle (with James Hetfield on drum kit) (Moby Dick (by Led Zeppelin)/One/Hit The Lights/Walk This Way (by Aerosmith)"	9:43
13.	"Guitar solo (Mistreated (by Deep Purple))"	8:49
Total length:		1:54:29

===== VHS two/DVD one =====
No.	Title	Length
14.	"The Four Horsemen"	5:30
15.	"For Whom the Bell Tolls"	5:50
16.	"Fade to Black"	7:19
17.	"Whiplash"	7:41
18.	"Master of Puppets"	5:28
19.	"Seek & Destroy sung by Newsted"	15:44
20.	"One"	9:46
21.	"Last Caress"	3:54
22.	"Am I Evil?"	2:55
23.	"Battery"	7:27
24.	"Stone Cold Crazy/End credits"	13:06
Total length:		1:24:40

==== Seattle ====
Recorded at the Seattle Coliseum, Seattle, Washington on August 29 and 30, 1989.

===== VHS three/DVD two =====
No.	Title	Length
1.	"The Ecstasy of Gold/Blackened"	11:43
2.	"For Whom the Bell Tolls"	5:30
3.	"Welcome Home (Sanitarium)"	6:27
4.	"Harvester of Sorrow"	6:28
5.	"The Four Horsemen"	5:35
6.	"The Thing That Should Not Be"	7:14
7.	"Bass solo/To Live Is to Die Jam"	7:46
8.	"Master of Puppets"	8:46
9.	"Fade to Black"	8:10
10.	"Seek & Destroy"	8:05
11.	"...And Justice for All"	13:33
12.	"One"	7:48
13.	"Creeping Death"	7:48
14.	"Guitar solo (Little Wing (by Jimi Hendrix))"	6:34
15.	"Battery"	9:11
16.	"The Frayed Ends of Sanity Jam/Last Caress"	1:54
17.	"Am I Evil?"	4:06
18.	"Whiplash"	5:37
19.	"Breadfan/End credits"	8:20
Total length:		2:20:35

== Personnel ==
Metallica

- James Hetfield – lead vocals, rhythm guitar, guitar solo on "Nothing Else Matters"
- Kirk Hammett – lead guitar, backing vocals
- Jason Newsted – bass, backing vocals, occasional lead vocals
- Lars Ulrich – drums

Production

- James Hetfield; Lars Ulrich – producers
- Guy Charbonneau; Mick Hughes – engineers
- James "Jimbo" Barton; Kent Matcke; Mike Fraser – mixing
- Scott Humphrey – digital editing

== Charts ==
Chart (1993)	Peak position
US Billboard 200	26

== Video certifications ==
Region	Certification	Certified units/sales
Germany (BVMI)	Gold	25,000^{^}
United States (RIAA)	21× Platinum	699,993^{^}
^{^} Shipments figures based on certification alone.
