= Wherever We May Roam Tour =

1991–1992 concert tour by Metallica

Wherever We May Roam
- Tour by Metallica
- Associated album: Metallica
- Start date: August 1, 1991
- End date: May 8, 1993
- No. of shows: 250

Metallica concert chronology
- Monsters of Rock '91 (1991); Wherever We May Roam (1991–1992); Guns N' Roses/Metallica Stadium Tour (1992)

Wherever We May Roam (mentioned by band members in interviews as Wherever I May Roam) was a concert tour by the American heavy metal band Metallica in support of their eponymous fifth studio album (commonly known as The Black Album). It began in late 1991, preceded by the Monsters of Rock tour in Europe and a Day on the Green show, consisting of mostly of arenas. This was followed by the Guns N' Roses/Metallica Stadium Tour, and the continuation of the tour in Europe, North America, Mexico, Asia, Australasia and South America.

These initial North American shows took place in arenas, with multiple dates in largely populated areas not uncommon. The band was at a commercial peak, following the release of their fifth and most commercially successful album Metallica and its breakthrough hit "Enter Sandman". The leg of the tour overlapped with the Freddie Mercury Tribute Concert, at which Metallica performed a short set.

The 1991 European leg was part of the Monsters of Rock festival. The last concert of that leg, held on September 28, 1991, at Tushino Airfield in Moscow, was described as "the first free outdoor Western rock concert in Soviet history" and had a crowd estimated between 150,000 and 500,000 people, with some unofficial estimates as high as 1,600,000. On the North American leg, the January 13 and 14, 1992, shows in San Diego were later released in the box set Live Shit: Binge & Purge, while the tour and the album were later documented in A Year and a Half in the Life of Metallica.

During the Guns N' Roses/Metallica Stadium Tour, Hetfield suffered second and third degree burns to his arms, face, hands, and legs during a live performance of the introduction of "Fade to Black".

== First typical setlist ==
(Taken from the Cincinnati, Ohio, Riverfront Coliseum show on March 2, 1992)

1. "Enter Sandman"
2. "Creeping Death"
3. "Harvester of Sorrow"
4. "Welcome Home (Sanitarium)"
5. "Sad but True"
6. "Wherever I May Roam"
7. Bass Solo
8. "Through the Never"
9. "The Unforgiven"
10. "Justice Medley"
  1. "Eye of the Beholder"
  2. "Blackened"
  3. "The Frayed Ends of Sanity"
  4. "...And Justice for All"
  5. "Blackened"
11. Drum solo
12. Guitar solo
13. "Nothing Else Matters"
14. "For Whom the Bell Tolls"
15. "Fade to Black"
16. "Whiplash"
17. "Master of Puppets"
18. "Seek & Destroy"
19. "One"
20. "Last Caress" (originally performed by the Misfits)
21. "Am I Evil?" (originally performed by Diamond Head)
22. "Battery"
23. "Stone Cold Crazy" (originally performed by Queen)

== Second typical setlist ==
(Taken from the Rome, Italy, Palamarino show on November 16, 1992)

1. "Enter Sandman"
2. "Creeping Death"
3. "Harvester of Sorrow"
4. "Welcome Home (Sanitarium)"
5. "Sad but True"
6. "Wherever I May Roam"
7. "The Unforgiven"
8. "Justice Medley"
  1. "Eye of the Beholder"
  2. "Blackened"
  3. "The Frayed Ends of Sanity"
  4. "...And Justice for All"
  5. "Blackened"
9. Bass Solo
10. Guitar Solo
11. "Through the Never"
12. "For Whom the Bell Tolls
13. "Fade to Black"
14. "Master of Puppets"
15. "Seek & Destroy"
16. "Whiplash"
17. "Nothing Else Matters"
18. "Am I Evil?" (originally performed by Diamond Head)
19. "Last Caress" (originally performed by the Misfits)
20. "One"
21. "Battery"
22. "Stone Cold Crazy" (originally performed by Queen)

== The show ==
The band dispensed with supporting acts on the tour, billing it on tickets as "An Evening with Metallica / No Opening Act". Instead, a video presentation was shown before the concerts actually started which lasted about 20 or 25 minutes. Included might be clips of local sights near the venue, Metallica shopping in local stores, roadies prepping the arena, Lars Ulrich walking around backstage giving introductions and reciting band history, or other band members engaging in various hijinks. The video would conclude with a montage of "The Ecstasy of Gold" by Ennio Morricone with film clips of Clint Eastwood in The Good, the Bad and the Ugly.

Setlists consisted of a mixture of Metallica (The Black Album) material with fan-favorite songs from their first four albums. Shows were typically three hours long.

The stage itself was a diamond form, with a number of singing and playing positions that would allow band members to rotate around. Two drum kits were typically setup on opposite sides of the stage, with the ability to lower the kits down below the stage or raise it to the stage itself, as well as move the kits around to different positions on the stage. Some selected fans were located in a pit inside the stage area dubbed the "Snakepit" by the band.

At different points in the show, individual solo slots were offered up, typically a bass solo, a guitar solo, then later a drum solo. The drum slot was often the most popular, with James Hetfield often taking a seat behind the second kit, dueling with Ulrich. Drum parts from other bands such as Slayer might be quoted, or Kirk Hammett might appear to play a bit of "Smoke on the Water" along with the drums. The bass solos often included segments with the guitars.

== Tour dates ==
List of 1991 concerts
Date	City	Country	Venue
August 1, 1991	Petaluma, California	United States	Phoenix Theater
August 2, 1991	Petaluma, California	United States	Phoenix Theater
August 10, 1991	Copenhagen	Denmark	Gentofte Stadion
August 13, 1991	Chorzów	Poland	Silesian Stadium
August 17, 1991	Castle Donington	England	Donington Park
August 22, 1991	Budapest	Hungary	Nepstadion
August 24, 1991	Munich	Germany	Galopprennbahn Riem
August 25, 1991	Basel	Switzerland	St. Jakob Stadium
August 27, 1991	Berlin	Germany	Waldbühne
August 28, 1991	Berlin	Germany	Waldbühne
August 30, 1991	Hasselt	Belgium	Domein Kiewit
August 31, 1991	Hanover	Germany	Niedersachsenstadion
September 1, 1991	Nijmegen	Netherlands	Stadion de Goffert
September 7, 1991	Mainz	Germany	Finthen Airfield
September 11, 1991	Graz	Austria	Liebenauer Stadium
September 14, 1991	Modena	Italy	Festa de l'Unità
September 17, 1991	Dortmund	Germany	Westfalenhallen
September 18, 1991	Dortmund	Germany	Westfalenhallen
September 21, 1991	Paris	France	Hippodrome de Vincennes
September 24, 1991	Barcelona	Spain	Estadi Olímpic Lluís Companys
September 28, 1991	Moscow	Soviet Union	Tushino Airfield
October 12, 1991	Oakland, California	United States	Oakland Stadium
October 29, 1991	Peoria, Illinois	United States	Peoria Civic Center
October 30, 1991	Madison, Wisconsin	United States	Dane County Coliseum
November 1, 1991	Muskegon, Michigan	United States	L. C. Walker Arena
November 2, 1991	Auburn Hills, Michigan	United States	The Palace of Auburn Hills
November 3, 1991	Auburn Hills, Michigan	United States	The Palace of Auburn Hills
November 5, 1991	Milwaukee, Wisconsin	United States	Bradley Center
November 6, 1991	Des Moines, Iowa	United States	Veterans Memorial Auditorium
November 8, 1991	Minneapolis, Minnesota	United States	Target Center
November 9, 1991	Duluth, Minnesota	United States	Duluth Arena Auditorium
November 10, 1991	Cedar Rapids, Iowa	United States	Five Seasons Center
November 12, 1991	Ashwaubenon, Wisconsin	United States	Brown County Veterans Memorial Arena
November 14, 1991	Toronto, Ontario	Canada	Maple Leaf Gardens
November 15, 1991	Toronto, Ontario	Canada	Maple Leaf Gardens
November 17, 1991	Montreal, Quebec	Canada	Montreal Forum
November 18, 1991	Ottawa, Ontario	Canada	Ottawa Civic Centre
November 19, 1991	Quebec City, Quebec	Canada	Colisée de Québec
November 21, 1991	Pittsburgh, Pennsylvania	United States	Pittsburgh Civic Arena
November 22, 1991	Indianapolis, Indiana	United States	Market Square Arena
November 24, 1991	St. Louis, Missouri	United States	St. Louis Arena
November 25, 1991	Fort Wayne, Indiana	United States	Allen County War Memorial Coliseum
November 27, 1991	Omaha, Nebraska	United States	Omaha Civic Auditorium
November 28, 1991	Kansas City, Missouri	United States	Kemper Arena
November 30, 1991	Richfield, Ohio	United States	Richfield Coliseum
December 1, 1991	Richfield, Ohio	United States	Richfield Coliseum
December 3, 1991	Buffalo, New York	United States	Buffalo Memorial Auditorium
December 5, 1991	Rosemont, Illinois	United States	Rosemont Horizon
December 6, 1991	Rosemont, Illinois	United States	Rosemont Horizon
December 7, 1991	Rosemont, Illinois	United States	Rosemont Horizon
December 18, 1991	Uniondale, New York	United States	Nassau Coliseum
December 19, 1991	Uniondale, New York	United States	Nassau Coliseum
December 20, 1991	Uniondale, New York	United States	Nassau Coliseum
December 22, 1991	Worcester, Massachusetts	United States	The Centrum
December 23, 1991	Worcester, Massachusetts	United States	The Centrum
December 31, 1991	Tokyo	Japan	Tokyo Dome

List of 1992 concerts
Date	City	Country	Venue
January 4, 1992	Paradise, Nevada	United States	Thomas & Mack Center
January 6, 1992	Inglewood, California	United States	The Forum
January 7, 1992	Inglewood, California	United States	The Forum
January 8, 1992	Inglewood, California	United States	The Forum
January 10, 1992	Sacramento, California	United States	ARCO Arena
January 11, 1992	Sacramento, California	United States	ARCO Arena
January 13, 1992	San Diego, California	United States	San Diego Sports Arena
January 14, 1992	San Diego, California	United States	San Diego Sports Arena
January 17, 1992	Houston, Texas	United States	The Summit
January 18, 1992	New Orleans, Louisiana	United States	Lakefront Arena
January 20, 1992	Little Rock, Arkansas	United States	Barton Coliseum
January 21, 1992	Dallas, Texas	United States	Reunion Arena
January 22, 1992	San Antonio, Texas	United States	Convention Center Arena
January 24, 1992	Oklahoma City, Oklahoma	United States	Myriad Arena
January 25, 1992	Tulsa, Oklahoma	United States	Expo Square Pavilion
January 27, 1992	Austin, Texas	United States	Frank Erwin Center
January 28, 1992	Shreveport, Louisiana	United States	Hirsch Memorial Coliseum
January 29, 1992	Memphis, Tennessee	United States	Pyramid Arena
January 31, 1992	El Paso, Texas	United States	UTEP Special Events Center
February 2, 1992	Albuquerque, New Mexico	United States	Tingley Coliseum
February 3, 1992	Lubbock, Texas	United States	Lubbock Municipal Coliseum
February 4, 1992	Odessa, Texas	United States	Ector County Coliseum
February 6, 1992	Denver, Colorado	United States	McNichols Sports Arena
February 7, 1992	Denver, Colorado	United States	McNichols Sports Arena
February 8, 1992	Denver, Colorado	United States	McNichols Sports Arena
February 10, 1992	Salt Lake City, Utah	United States	Delta Center
February 12, 1992	Inglewood, California	United States	The Forum
February 13, 1992	Inglewood, California	United States	The Forum
February 15, 1992	Fresno, California	United States	Selland Arena
February 16, 1992	Reno, Nevada	United States	Lawlor Events Center
February 27, 1992	Portland, Maine	United States	Cumberland County Civic Center
February 28, 1992	Albany, New York	United States	Knickerbocker Arena
February 29, 1992	Providence, Rhode Island	United States	Providence Civic Center
March 2, 1992	Cincinnati, Ohio	United States	Riverfront Coliseum
March 4, 1992	Carbondale, Illinois	United States	SIU Arena
March 5, 1992	Champaign, Illinois	United States	Assembly Hall
March 7, 1992	Knoxville, Tennessee	United States	Thompson–Boling Arena
March 8, 1992	Evansville, Indiana	United States	Roberts Municipal Stadium
March 9, 1992	Nashville, Tennessee	United States	Nashville Municipal Auditorium
March 11, 1992	Roanoke, Virginia	United States	Roanoke Civic Center
March 12, 1992	Chattanooga, Tennessee	United States	UTC Arena
March 14, 1992	Miami, Florida	United States	Miami Arena
March 15, 1992	Jacksonville, Florida	United States	Veterans Memorial Coliseum
March 16, 1992	Orlando, Florida	United States	Orlando Arena
March 18, 1992	Huntsville, Alabama	United States	Von Braun Center
March 19, 1992	Louisville, Kentucky	United States	Freedom Hall
March 21, 1992	Charlotte, North Carolina	United States	Charlotte Coliseum
March 22, 1992	Charleston, West Virginia	United States	Charleston Civic Center
March 24, 1992	Pensacola, Florida	United States	Pensacola Civic Center
March 25, 1992	Birmingham, Alabama	United States	Jefferson Civic Coliseum
March 26, 1992	Greensboro, North Carolina	United States	Greensboro Coliseum
March 28, 1992	Atlanta, Georgia	United States	The Omni
March 29, 1992	Atlanta, Georgia	United States	The Omni
March 31, 1992	Richmond, Virginia	United States	Richmond Coliseum
April 1, 1992	Landover, Maryland	United States	Capital Centre
April 2, 1992	Landover, Maryland	United States	Capital Centre
April 4, 1992	East Rutherford, New Jersey	United States	Meadowlands Arena
April 6, 1992	Philadelphia, Pennsylvania	United States	Spectrum
April 7, 1992	Philadelphia, Pennsylvania	United States	Spectrum
April 8, 1992	East Rutherford, New Jersey	United States	Meadowlands Arena
April 10, 1992	Hampton, Virginia	United States	Hampton Coliseum
April 12, 1992	Binghamton, New York	United States	Broome County Veterans Memorial Arena
April 13, 1992	Rochester, New York	United States	Rochester Community War Memorial
April 14, 1992	Hamilton, Ontario	Canada	Copps Coliseum
April 16, 1992	Hartford, Connecticut	United States	Hartford Civic Center
April 20, 1992	London	England	Wembley Stadium
May 6, 1992	Pullman, Washington	United States	Beasley Coliseum
May 7, 1992	Boise, Idaho	United States	BSU Pavilion
May 9, 1992	Daly City, California	United States	Cow Palace
May 10, 1992	Daly City, California	United States	Cow Palace
May 13, 1992	Rapid City, South Dakota	United States	Rushmore Plaza Civic Center
May 14, 1992	Sioux Falls, South Dakota	United States	Sioux Falls Arena
May 15, 1992	Fargo, North Dakota	United States	Bison Sports Arena
May 17, 1992	Winnipeg, Manitoba	Canada	Winnipeg Arena
May 18, 1992	Saskatoon, Saskatchewan	Canada	Saskatchewan Place
May 19, 1992	Edmonton, Alberta	Canada	Northlands Coliseum
May 21, 1992	Calgary, Alberta	Canada	Olympic Saddledome
May 23, 1992	Vancouver, British Columbia	Canada	PNE Coliseum
May 24, 1992	Vancouver, British Columbia	Canada	PNE Coliseum
May 27, 1992	Seattle, Washington	United States	Seattle Center Coliseum
May 28, 1992	Seattle, Washington	United States	Seattle Center Coliseum
May 30, 1992	Anchorage, Alaska	United States	Sullivan Arena
June 1, 1992	Portland, Oregon	United States	Memorial Coliseum
June 2, 1992	Portland, Oregon	United States	Memorial Coliseum
June 4, 1992	Salt Lake City, Utah	United States	Delta Center
June 5, 1992	Casper, Wyoming	United States	Casper Events Center
June 6, 1992	Billings, Montana	United States	Metrapark Arena
June 9, 1992	Tucson, Arizona	United States	Tucson Convention Center
June 10, 1992	Phoenix, Arizona	United States	America West Arena
June 11, 1992	Phoenix, Arizona	United States	America West Arena
June 14, 1992	Mobile, Alabama	United States	Mobile Civic Center
June 15, 1992	Baton Rouge, Louisiana	United States	LSU Assembly Center
June 16, 1992	Jackson, Mississippi	United States	Mississippi Coliseum
June 19, 1992	Nashville, Tennessee	United States	Starwood Amphitheatre
June 20, 1992	Maryland Heights, Missouri	United States	Riverport Amphitheatre
June 21, 1992	Bonner Springs, Kansas	United States	Sandstone Amphitheater
June 23, 1992	Cincinnati, Ohio	United States	Riverbend Music Center
June 25, 1992	Raleigh, North Carolina	United States	Walnut Creek Amphitheatre
June 27, 1992	Charlevoix, Michigan	United States	Castle Farms Music Theater
June 28, 1992	Thornville, Ohio	United States	Buckeye Lake Music Center
June 30, 1992	Milwaukee, Wisconsin	United States	Marcus Amphitheater
July 1, 1992	Tinley Park, Illinois	United States	World Music Theater
July 3, 1992	Cuyahoga Falls, Ohio	United States	Blossom Music Center
July 4, 1992	Weedsport, New York	United States	Cayuga County Fair Speedway
July 5, 1992	Allentown, Pennsylvania	United States	Great Allentown Fair
October 22, 1992	Ghent	Belgium	Flanders Expo
October 24, 1992	London	England	Wembley Arena
October 25, 1992	London	England	Wembley Arena
October 27, 1992	Glasgow	Scotland	SECC Arena
October 28, 1992	Newcastle	England	Whitley Bay Ice Rink
October 30, 1992	Dublin	Ireland	Point Theatre
November 1, 1992	Sheffield	England	Sheffield Arena
November 3, 1992	Manchester	England	Manchester Central Convention Complex
November 4, 1992	Birmingham	England	NEC Arena
November 5, 1992	Birmingham	England	NEC Arena
November 7, 1992	Rotterdam	Netherlands	Rotterdam Ahoy
November 8, 1992	Rotterdam	Netherlands	Rotterdam Ahoy
November 10, 1992	Paris	France	Palais Omnisports de Paris-Bercy
November 12, 1992	Barcelona	Spain	Palau Sant Jordi
November 13, 1992	San Sebastián	Spain	Velódromo de Anoeta
November 16, 1992	Rome	Italy	Palamarino
November 17, 1992	Milan	Italy	Palatrussardi
November 18, 1992	Zürich	Switzerland	Hallenstadion
November 20, 1992	Vienna	Austria	Wiener Stadthalle
November 22, 1992	Munich	Germany	Olympiahalle
November 23, 1992	Stuttgart	Germany	Hanns-Martin-Schleyer-Halle
November 24, 1992	Dortmund	Germany	Westfalenhalle
November 26, 1992	Frankfurt	Germany	Festhalle Frankfurt
November 27, 1992	Nuremberg	Germany	Frankenhalle
November 29, 1992	Nuremberg	Germany	Frankenhalle
November 30, 1992	Mannheim	Germany	Maimarkthalle
December 1, 1992	Stuttgart	Germany	Schleyerhalle
December 3, 1992	Kiel	Germany	Ostseehalle
December 5, 1992	Berlin	Germany	Deutschlandhalle
December 7, 1992	's-Hertogenbosch	Netherlands	Brabanthallen
December 9, 1992	Copenhagen	Denmark	Forum Copenhagen
December 10, 1992	Copenhagen	Denmark	Forum Copenhagen
December 12, 1992	Gothenburg	Sweden	Scandinavium
December 14, 1992	Oslo	Norway	Oslo Spektrum
December 16, 1992	Helsinki	Finland	Helsinki Ice Hall
December 18, 1992	Stockholm	Sweden	Stockholm Globe Arena

List of 1993 concerts
Date	City	Country	Venue
January 22, 1993	Kalamazoo, Michigan	United States	Wings Stadium
January 23, 1993	Toledo, Ohio	United States	John F. Savage Hall
January 26, 1993	Hershey, Pennsylvania	United States	Hersheypark Arena
January 28, 1993	Iowa City, Iowa	United States	Carver–Hawkeye Arena
January 29, 1993	La Crosse, Wisconsin	United States	La Crosse Center
January 31, 1993	Rockford, Illinois	United States	Rockford MetroCentre
February 1, 1993	Saginaw, Michigan	United States	Wendler Arena
February 2, 1993	Fairborn, Ohio	United States	Ervin J. Nutter Center
February 4, 1993	Johnson City, Tennessee	United States	Freedom Hall Civic Center
February 5, 1993	Lexington, Kentucky	United States	Rupp Arena
February 6, 1993	Greenville, South Carolina	United States	Greenville Memorial Auditorium
February 9, 1993	Moncton, New Brunswick	Canada	Moncton Coliseum
February 10, 1993	Halifax, Nova Scotia	Canada	Halifax Metro Centre
February 12, 1993	Montreal, Quebec	Canada	Montreal Forum
February 13, 1993	Montreal, Quebec	Canada	Montreal Forum
February 15, 1993	Amherst, Massachusetts	United States	Mullins Center
February 17, 1993	North Charleston, South Carolina	United States	North Charleston Coliseum
February 19, 1993	St. Petersburg, Florida	United States	Bayfront Center Arena
February 20, 1993	North Fort Myers, Florida	United States	Lee County Civic Center
February 21, 1993	Tallahassee, Florida	United States	Leon County Civic Center
February 25, 1993	Mexico City	Mexico	Palacio de los Deportes
February 26, 1993	Mexico City	Mexico	Palacio de los Deportes
February 27, 1993	Mexico City	Mexico	Palacio de los Deportes
March 1, 1993	Mexico City	Mexico	Palacio de los Deportes
March 2, 1993	Mexico City	Mexico	Palacio de los Deportes
March 12, 1993	Honolulu	United States	Neal S. Blaisdell Center
March 13, 1993	Honolulu	United States	Neal S. Blaisdell Center
March 16, 1993	Tokyo	Japan	Yoyogi Olympic Pool
March 17, 1993	Tokyo	Japan	Yoyogi Olympic Pool
March 18, 1993	Yokohama	Japan	Yokohama Arena
March 21, 1993	Fukuoka	Japan	Sun Palace
March 22, 1993	Osaka	Japan	Castle Hall
March 23, 1993	Nagoya	Japan	Century Hall
March 26, 1993	Auckland	New Zealand	The Supertop
March 27, 1993	Sydney	Australia	Sydney Entertainment Centre
March 29, 1993	Brisbane	Australia	Brisbane Entertainment Centre
March 31, 1993	Sydney	Australia	Sydney Entertainment Centre
April 1, 1993	Sydney	Australia	Sydney Entertainment Centre
April 3, 1993	Melbourne	Australia	National Tennis Centre
April 4, 1993	Melbourne	Australia	National Tennis Centre
April 5, 1993	Adelaide	Australia	Adelaide Entertainment Centre
April 7, 1993	Perth	Australia	Perth Entertainment Centre
April 8, 1993	Perth	Australia	Perth Entertainment Centre
April 10, 1993	Jakarta	Indonesia	Lebak Bulus Stadium
April 11, 1993	Jakarta	Indonesia	Lebak Bulus Stadium
April 13, 1993	Singapore		Singapore Indoor Stadium
April 15, 1993	Bangkok	Thailand	Thai Japanese Youth Center
April 17, 1993	Manila	Philippines	PhilSports Football Stadium
May 1, 1993	São Paulo	Brazil	Estádio Palestra Itália
May 2, 1993	São Paulo	Brazil	Estádio Palestra Itália
May 4, 1993	Santiago	Chile	Velódromo Estadio Nacional
May 7, 1993	Buenos Aires	Argentina	Estadio Vélez Sarsfield
May 8, 1993	Buenos Aires	Argentina	Estadio Vélez Sarsfield

== Personnel ==
- James Hetfield – lead vocals, rhythm guitar
- Kirk Hammett – lead guitar, backing vocals
- Lars Ulrich – drums
- Jason Newsted – bass, backing vocals
