= A Tribute to the Four Horsemen =

Compilation album by Various artists
- Released: 2002
- Genres: Thrash metal, heavy metal
- Label: Nuclear Blast America

A Tribute to the Four Horsemen is a tribute album to thrash metal band Metallica. It was re-issued by Nuclear Blast Records in 2003 with a slightly different track listing. The album title is in reference to "The Four Horsemen" from Kill 'Em All and contains covers of songs by Metallica from Kill 'Em All to ReLoad, but omits Load.

The liner notes were written by German music journalist Christof Leim, then working for the German edition of Metal Hammer magazine.

== Track listing ==
Track	Title	Performer	Original Album	Length
1.	"Seek & Destroy"	Primal Fear	Kill 'Em All	7:10
2.	"Fight Fire with Fire"	Therion	Ride the Lightning	4:28
3.	"Whiplash"	Destruction	Kill 'Em All	3:32
4.	"Phantom Lord"	Anthrax	Kill 'Em All	4:29
5.	"Fade to Black"	Sonata Arctica	Ride the Lightning	5:43
6.	"Master of Puppets"	Burden of Grief	Master of Puppets	9:09
7.	"My Friend of Misery"	Dark Tranquillity	Metallica	5:25
8.	"One"	Crematory	...And Justice for All	4:24
9.	"Eye of the Beholder"	In Flames	...And Justice for All	5:31
10.	"The Thing That Should Not Be" (original) "Welcome Home (Sanitarium)" (re-issue)	Primus; Thunderstone	Master of Puppets	6:43; 5:06
11.	"Harvester of Sorrow" (original) "The Memory Remains" (re-issue)	Apocalyptica; The Kovenant	...And Justice for All; ReLoad	6:14; 4:31
12.	"Battery" (original) "Wherever I May Roam" (re-issue)	Die Krupps; Sinner	Master of Puppets; Metallica	5:19; 5:15
13.	"Wherever I May Roam" (original) "Damage, Inc." (re-issue)	Sinner; Tankard	Metallica; Master of Puppets	5:15; 5:10
14.	"Motorbreath" (Live) (omitted from re-issue)	Rage	Kill 'Em All	3:03
