= Sick of the Studio '07 =

2007 concert tour by Metallica

- Tour by Metallica
- Location: Europe
- Start date: June 28, 2007
- End date: October 28, 2007
- Legs: 2
- No. of shows: 14

Metallica concert chronology
- Escape from the Studio '06 (2006); Sick of the Studio '07 (2007); 2008 European Vacation Tour (2008)

Sick of the Studio '07 was a concert tour by the American heavy metal band Metallica, which took place in Europe. The first four concerts were in festivals and the last eight in stadiums. The band held a tourname-competition among the fans and they personally chose the winning suggestion. The band did not play the "New Song" but the "Other New Song", which they had played on the previous tour (Escape from the Studio '06), was played at the Bilbao BBK Live Festival The setlists of the tour were full of old songs. In Lisbon, Metallica performed "...And Justice for All" for the first time since October 1989.

On July 13, there was a power failure at the Denmark show and the PA went down. The recording of the show stopped. After the accident the band offered half of the show for a free download.

== Typical setlist ==
(Taken from the Athens, Greece Rockwave Festival show on July 3, 2007)

1. "Creeping Death"
2. "Fuel"
3. "Wherever I May Roam"
4. "For Whom the Bell Tolls"
5. "Welcome Home (Sanitarium)"
6. "...And Justice for All"
7. "The Memory Remains"
8. "Disposable Heroes"
9. "Orion"
10. "Fade to Black"
11. "Master of Puppets"
12. "Battery"
13. "Sad but True"
14. "Nothing Else Matters"
15. "One"
16. "Enter Sandman"
17. "Whiplash"
18. "Seek & Destroy"

== Tour dates ==
List of 2007 concerts
Date	City	Country	Venue	Box office
June 28, 2007 (Note: The concert on June 28, 2007 in Lisbon was part of Super Bock Super Rock.)	Lisbon	Portugal	Parque Tejo	—N/a
June 29, 2007 (Note: The concert on June 29, 2007 in Bilbao was part of Bilbao BBK Live.)	Bilbao	Spain	Mount Cobetas	—N/a
July 1, 2007 (Note: The concert on July 1, 2007 in Werchter was part of Live Earth.)	Werchter	Belgium	Festivalpark Werchter	—N/a
July 3, 2007 (Note: The concert on July 3, 2007 in Malakasa was part of Rockwave Festival.)	Malakasa	Greece	Terra Vibe Park	—N/a
July 5, 2007	Vienna	Austria	Rotundenplatz	—N/a
July 7, 2007 (Note: The concert on July 7, 2007 in London was part of Live Earth.)	London	England	Wembley Stadium	—N/a
July 8, 2007	London	England	Wembley Stadium	—N/a
July 10, 2007	Oslo	Norway	Valle Hovin	$4,121,600
July 12, 2007	Stockholm	Sweden	Stockholm Olympic Stadium	—N/a
July 13, 2007	Aarhus	Denmark	Vestereng	$5,921,398
July 15, 2007	Helsinki	Finland	Helsinki Olympic Stadium	$3,972,320
July 18, 2007	Moscow	Russia	Luzhniki Stadium	—N/a
October 27, 2007 (Note: The concerts on October 27 and 28, 2007 in Mountain View were part of Bridge School Benefit.)	Mountain View	United States	Shoreline Amphitheatre	—N/a
October 28, 2007	Mountain View	United States	Shoreline Amphitheatre	—N/a

== Songlist ==
Album	Song	Times
Kill 'Em All (1983)	"The Four Horsemen"	7
Kill 'Em All (1983)	"Whiplash"	8
Kill 'Em All (1983)	"Seek & Destroy"	11
Ride the Lightning (1984)	"Ride the Lightning"	5
Ride the Lightning (1984)	"For Whom the Bell Tolls"	9
Ride the Lightning (1984)	"Fade to Black"	7
Ride the Lightning (1984)	"Creeping Death"	11
Master of Puppets (1986)	"Battery"	7
Master of Puppets (1986)	"Master of Puppets"	11
Master of Puppets (1986)	"The Thing That Should Not Be"	1
Master of Puppets (1986)	"Welcome Home (Sanitarium)"	8
Master of Puppets (1986)	"Disposable Heroes"	13
Master of Puppets (1986)	"Leper Messiah"	1
Master of Puppets (1986)	"Orion"	11
Master of Puppets (1986)	"Damage, Inc."	1
...And Justice for All (1988)	"...And Justice for All"	10
...And Justice for All (1988)	"One"	11
Metallica (1991)	"Enter Sandman"	12
Metallica (1991)	"Sad But True"	11
Metallica (1991)	"The Unforgiven"	6
Metallica (1991)	"Wherever I May Roam"	7
Metallica (1991)	"Nothing Else Matters"	14
ReLoad (1997)	"Fuel"	3
ReLoad (1997)	"The Memory Remains"	11
Garage Inc. (1998)	"Turn the Page"	1
Garage Inc. (1998)	"Last Caress"	1
Garage Inc. (1998)	"Am I Evil?"	3
Garage Inc. (1998)	"Stone Cold Crazy"	1
S&M (1999)	"No Leaf Clover"	5
St. Anger (2003)	"All Within My Hands"	2
New songs	"The Other New Song"	1
Rare Earth cover	"I Just Want to Celebrate"	2
Nazareth cover	"Please Don't Judas Me"	2
Garbage cover	"Only Happy When It Rains"	1
Blue Öyster Cult cover	"Veteran of the Psychic Wars"	1
Dire Straits cover	"Brothers in Arms"	2

== Personnel ==
- James Hetfield – vocals, rhythm guitar
- Kirk Hammett – lead guitar
- Lars Ulrich – drums
- Robert Trujillo – bass
