= A Year and a Half in the Life of Metallica =

Video by Metallica
- Released: November 17, 1992
- Genre: Heavy metal
- Length: 236 minutes
- Language: English
- Label: Elektra Entertainment
- Director: Adam Dubin
- Producer: Juliana Roberts

Metallica video chronology
2 of One (1989)	A Year and a Half in the Life of Metallica (1992)	Live Shit: Binge & Purge (1993)

A Year and a Half in the Life of Metallica is a two-part documentary about the process of making the Metallica album (or "The Black Album") and the following tour. It was produced by Juliana Roberts and directed by Adam Dubin.

A Year and a Half in the Life of Metallica was released as a double VHS pack. Both parts are available on a single DVD, but only in region 1.

== Part 1 ==
This 90-minute video shows how Metallica and their producer Bob Rock worked their way through making the Metallica album. It also includes the making of the video for "Enter Sandman" and also a listening party for invited fans to come and listen to the album in full. The video as well highlights tensions between Bob Rock and Metallica. The infamous exchange between Kirk Hammett and Bob Rock during the recording of "The Unforgiven" guitar solo is documented.

This video also includes three of the music videos the band shot for that album:

- "Enter Sandman"
- "The Unforgiven"
- "Nothing Else Matters"

== Part 2 ==
The second part runs approximately two-and-a-half hours and follows Metallica at the start of their Wherever We May Roam Tour in Europe through to the Guns N' Roses/Metallica Stadium Tour of 1992. Included are performances of "For Whom the Bell Tolls" from Donington on August 17, 1991, "Enter Sandman" from the MTV Video Music Awards on September 5, "Harvester of Sorrow" from Moscow on September 28, "Sad but True" from the Day on the Green festival in Oakland, California on October 12, "Enter Sandman" from the Freddie Mercury Tribute Concert on April 20, 1992, and "Nothing Else Matters" from Phoenix on August 25.

Jason Newsted after a concert in Portland, Maine, is seen making sandwiches to take back to a hotel with him instead of ordering room-service. His response to being called a cheapskate is "I got plans for those millions and it ain't for fucking sandwiches!"

Sebastian Bach is seen joking with Slash and Lars Ulrich in Metallica's dressing room at RFK Stadium in Washington, D.C. prior to the opening concert of the joint tour with Guns N' Roses. Bach humorously imitates MTV host Riki Rachtman, and former Metallica guitarist Dave Mustaine.

The band also encounter Spinal Tap, who jokingly ask them about the similarities between their album's covers.

This part of the documentary also includes two music videos:

- "Wherever I May Roam"
- "Sad but True"
