= To Live Is to Die =

1988 song by Metallica

Song by Metallica

from the album ...And Justice for All
- Released: September 7, 1988
- Genre: Heavy metal; technical thrash metal
- Length: 9:48
- Label: Elektra
- Composers: James Hetfield; Lars Ulrich; Cliff Burton
- Lyricist: Cliff Burton
- Producers: James Hetfield; Flemming Rasmussen; Lars Ulrich

Audio
- "To Live Is To Die" on YouTube

"To Live Is to Die" is a song by the American heavy metal band Metallica from their fourth studio album, ...And Justice for All, released on September 7, 1988. Made as a tribute to their former bassist Cliff Burton, who died two years before the song's release, the heavy metal track is built on a riff that he wrote before his death. Though predominantly an instrumental, it incorporates a spoken word section where James Hetfield recites a poem written by Burton, with some lines taken from German poet Paul Gerhardt and American novelist Stephen R. Donaldson.

The song has received positive responses from music critics, many of whom commented on its role as a tribute and its associated sentimental value. Metallica initially went several years without performing the song in their live concerts due to the emotional context behind it. They played the song in full for the first time during one of the performances of their 30th anniversary celebration at The Fillmore in 2011, after their current bassist Robert Trujillo pushed for it to be played.

== Background ==
Metallica released their third studio album, Master of Puppets, in 1986. To promote the album, the band embarked on the Damage, Inc. Tour throughout that year. On September 27, 1986, shortly after playing a show in Stockholm, the band's tour bus crashed and ended up crushing their then-bassist Cliff Burton, killing him. Though Burton was succeeded by Jason Newsted as the band's bassist, the death of Burton devastated the band. They began working on their fourth studio album, ...And Justice for All, in 1987. Flemming Rasmussen served as producer with some assistance from Hetfield and Ulrich. The album's instrumental, "To Live Is to Die", was made as a tribute to Burton.

== Writing and composition ==
"To Live Is to Die"
An excerpt of the middle portion of "To Live Is to Die", featuring Hetfield's guitar solo. J.S. Gornael of Collider highlighted the middle of the track multiple times for its sound.

"To Live Is to Die" was recorded from January to May 1988. It is built off of a riff that Burton demoed during the production of Master of Puppets that went unused. Burton also wrote the song's introduction and build-up. Alongside Burton contributions, the song was written by James Hetfield and Lars Ulrich; Burton's posthumous writing credit makes "To Live Is to Die" his final contribution towards a Metallica song. Hetfield described "To Live Is to Die" as a "homage to Cliff without going over the top", and that it's about "how grateful we were to have that time with him". For his performance, guitarist Kirk Hammett incorporated a sound effect of him adjusting the volume control, which was inspired by Kiss member Ace Frehley.

"To Live Is to Die" is a heavy metal and technical thrash metal track played at 56 beats per minute, and shifts between multiple different keys, including B minor, E minor, and A minor. The song comprises multiple different sections; it opens up with an acoustic guitar medley accompanied by light percussion, before leading into an electric guitar build-up and a section which alters and builds upon the main medley. The song features guitar solos from both Hammett and Hetfield, with the latter's solo being the middle section of the song.

=== Poem and title ===
"When a man lies, he murders some part of the world.
These are the pale deaths which men miscall their lives.
All this I cannot bear to witness any longer.
Cannot the kingdom of salvation take me home?"

— Cliff Burton, "To Live Is To Die"

While "To Live Is to Die" is mostly an instrumental track, it features a spoken word section by Hetfield near the end of the song, in which he recites a poem that was written by Burton before his death. The poem consists of lines made by Burton, as well as two other writers, namely German poet Paul Gerhardt and American novelist Stephen R. Donaldson. The first line ("When a man lies, he murders some part of the world") is a translation of Gerhardt's work, while the second line ("These are all pale deaths which men miscall their lives") is taken from Donaldson's Lord Foul's Bane (1977). The last two lines ("All this I cannot bear to witness any longer / Cannot the kingdom of salvation take me home?") were penned by Burton. Likewise, the name of the song was based on one of Burton's favorite phrases, according to Hetfield. Despite only writing half of the section, the lyrics of the song are attributed to him in the liner notes.

== Release and live performance ==
...And Justice for All was released on September 7, 1988; "To Live Is To Die" is the eighth song on the track list. In 2018, a remastered version of ...And Justice for All, including "To Live Is to Die", was released. Alongside the release of the remaster, a deluxe box set for the album was released that included several demos of "To Live Is to Die", with some dated to 1986 and 1987.

Until 2011, Metallica refrained from performing "To Live Is to Die" in any of their live concerts due to the emotional context behind it, aside from minor excerpts being incorporated into jam sessions. On December 7, 2011, the band performed the song in full for the first time during the second night of their 30th anniversary celebrations at the Fillmore in San Francisco. The performance was the result of their current bassist, Robert Trujillo, pushing for the song to be performed during the event.

== Critical reception and legacy ==
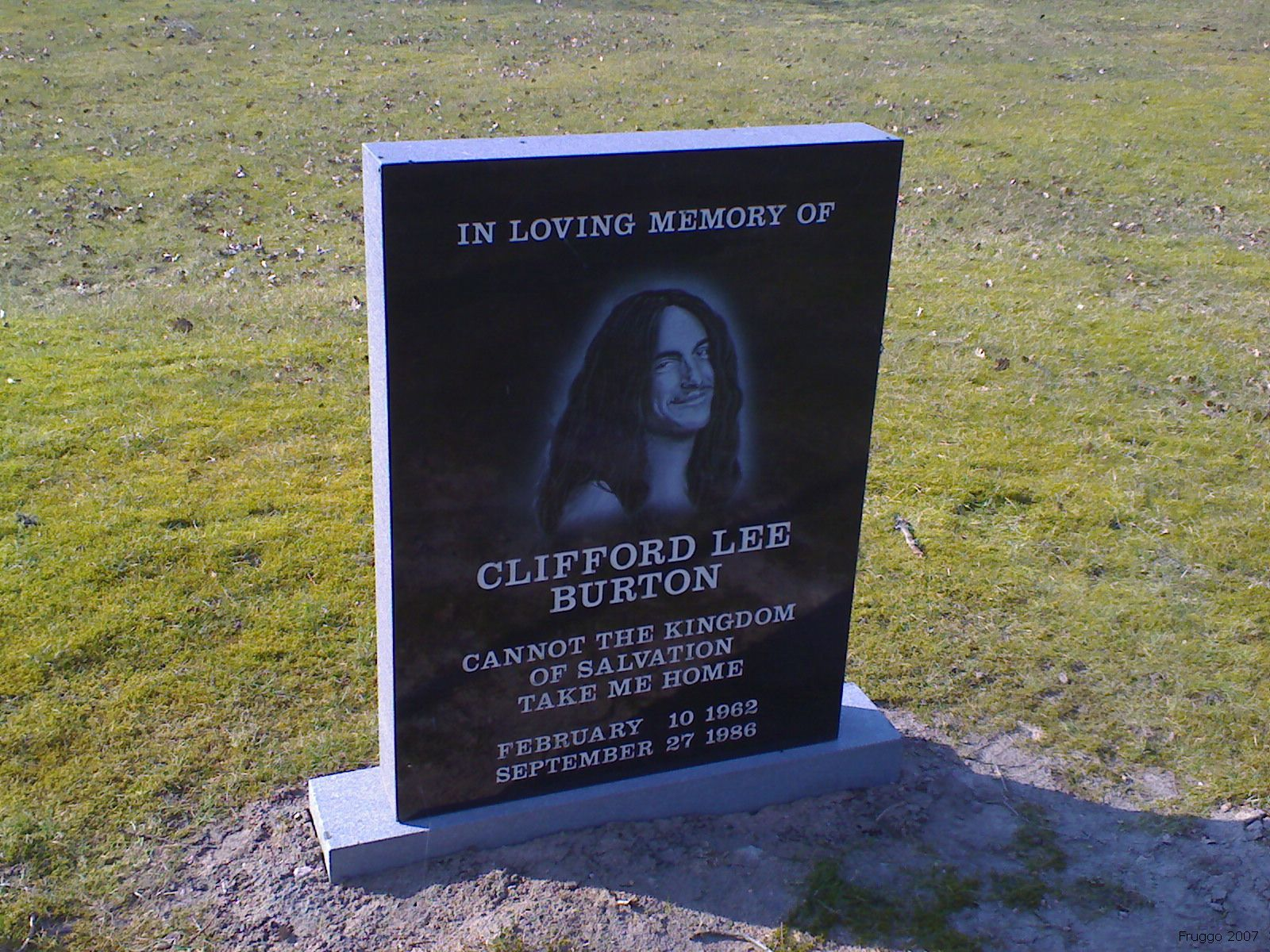
The last line of the poem featured in the song is featured on Burton's memorial stone, erected near the site of the bus crash.

Sean T. Collins of Pitchfork referred to "To Live Is to Die" as the "Rosetta Stone" of ...And Justice for All. He described it as the band's "artistic outlet for their sublimated grief", and highlighted the song's poem as "bleaker than anything the band recorded before or since". In an article discussing Metallica songs that he deemed to be underrated, J.S. Gornael of Collider deemed "To Live Is To Die" as a "near-perfect, sincere confrontation with a devastating loss", describing it as an example of heavy metal music having the "capacity to evoke both the sadness and the rage that may come from mourning". He particularly highlighted the song's third movement and the poem section, with the former being "enough to bring a tear to the eye". Joe Gross of Rolling Stone believed that the song was a "lovely tribute" to Burton, and "everything that came after as well". Greg Pratt Decibel described the song as a "very intense, very advanced listen", although one that was hard to highlight over other songs on the album due to being an instrumental. Borivoj Krgin of Metal Forces labeled it as "possibly Metallica’s best instrumental yet", highlighting the song's variation in structure as keeping things fresh and making it not seem as long as it was.

In their rankings of the songs in Metallica's discography, WMMR and Spin both ranked "To Live Is to Die" as Metallica's 38th best song; Spin described the song as evolving from a funeral march, to "solemn remembrance with glimpses of Burton’s grandiosity", before everyone "breaks down at the end"; they further highlighted the ending of the song as the "wordless cry of grief". Rolling Stone ranked it as Metallica's 47th best song. In a separate ranking of underrated Metallica songs, Gornael ranked "To Live Is to Die" as Metallica's third-most underrated song, describing it as "pretty much perfect from start to finish" and once again highlighting the song's middle section as "carry[ing] the weight of tragedy". Paul Travers of Louder Sound ranked it as Metallica's second best instrumental, behind "Orion" from Master of Puppets.

The song's title is the namesake for Joel McIver's biography on Burton's life, published in 2009. The last line of the poem is engraved onto Burton's gravestone, as well as a memorial stone that was erected near the site of the bus crash that killed him. The symphonic metal band Apocalyptica included a cover of "To Live Is to Die" on Plays Metallica, Vol. 2 (2024), an album which consists entirely of Metallica covers.

== Personnel ==
Credits adapted from the album's liner notes.

Metallica

- James Hetfield – vocals, rhythm guitar, acoustic guitar, second guitar solo
- Lars Ulrich – drums
- Kirk Hammett – lead guitar
- Jason Newsted – bass

Technical personnel

- Flemming Rasmussen – production, engineering
- Toby "Rage" Wright – assistant and additional engineering
- Steve Thompson – mixing
- Michael Barbiero – mixing
- George Cowan – assistant mixing engineer
- Bob Ludwig – mastering
- Reuben Cohen – 2018 remastering
