= Blackened (song) =

1988 song by Metallica

Song by Metallica

from the album ...And Justice for All
- Released: August 25, 1988
- Genre: Thrash metal; progressive metal
- Length: 6:42
- Label: Elektra
- Composers: James Hetfield; Lars Ulrich; Jason Newsted
- Lyricist: James Hetfield
- Producers: James Hetfield; Flemming Rasmussen; Lars Ulrich

Audio
- "Blackened" on YouTube

"Blackened" is a song by American heavy metal band Metallica and the opening track from their fourth studio album, ...And Justice for All, released on August 25, 1988. Written by band members James Hetfield, Lars Ulrich, and Jason Newsted, it is a thrash metal and progressive metal song with environmentalist lyrics that discuss the idea of nuclear warfare leading to the extinction of humanity and the destruction of Earth. It is the first Metallica song Newsted was credited with writing and the only song he is credited for on the album. Hetfield and Ulrich produced the track with Flemming Rasmussen.

"Blackened" has been positively received by critics, who praised its composition and usage as an opening song, with others also complimenting its lyrics. Several publications consider it to be one of the band's best songs, and it has been described as a fan favorite. It is among Metallica's most performed songs live from ...And Justice for All, and has been subject to several cover versions. In 2020, the band recorded an acoustic rendition of the song titled "Blackened 2020", which was released as a single on May 15, 2020. "Blackened" later became the namesake for the band's future independent record label and its whiskey brand. It has been certified gold by the Australian Recording Industry Association and the Recording Industry Association of America.

== Background and release ==
Metallica began work on their fourth studio album, ...And Justice for All, in 1987. It was their first album featuring bassist Jason Newsted, who joined the band following the death of Cliff Burton the previous year. While most of the album was written by band members James Hetfield, Lars Ulrich, and Kirk Hammett, Newsted received his only co-writing credit on the album for composing "Blackened"'s main bass guitar riff. The song was also the first one to be written for the album. The album was produced by Flemming Rasmussen with some assistance from Hetfield and Ulrich. Due to decisions made by the band during the production of ...And Justice for All, the album, including "Blackened", notoriously lacks an audible bass mix.

...And Justice for All was released on August 25, 1988, through Elektra Records; "Blackened" is the album's opening track. Live versions of "Blackened" have been included as B-sides for some future Metallica singles, specifically 2003's "Frantic" and 2008's "All Nightmare Long", as well as several of the band's live albums. In 2018, a remastered version of ...And Justice for All, including "Blackened", was released. Alongside the release of the remaster, a deluxe box set for the album was released that included several demos and live recordings of "Blackened". The song has been certified gold by the Australian Recording Industry Association (ARIA) and the Recording Industry Association of America (RIAA).

== Composition and lyrics ==
"Blackened" has been described as a thrash metal and progressive metal song. It is six minutes and forty-two seconds long. Played at an average beats per minute of 190, it is one of Metallica's fastest songs. The song opens up with several layered guitar harmonies played backwards that slowly build up and break down into what Bryan Reesman of The A.V. Club described as a "riff heavy sonic attack" that "balances menace with melody". Each time that the riff is played throughout the song, its ending notes are altered. At one point, the song slows down before going into a guitar solo. The song features 19 different tempo changes, which all go between different time signatures including 4/4, 3/4, 5/4 and 7/4.

Lyrically, the song is centered around the idea of nuclear warfare wiping out humanity and destroying Earth in the process. Its environmentalist themes have also been noted, with some believing its lyrics can be applied to the climate crisis and environmental degradation. These themes are illustrated by lyrics such as "Color our world blackened", and "Termination / Expiration / Cancellation / Human race".

== Critical reception and legacy ==
The composition of "Blackened" was praised by critics, with many comparing it to the opening track of Master of Puppets, "Battery". Metal Hammer said that the song as another "rallying-call opener" in the same vein as "Battery", while Sam Law of Kerrang! claimed that "Blackened" echoed "Battery" whilst expanding its scope, particularly with the "winding structure". Metal Hammer further described "Blackened" as a song that had "venomous intent". Greg Pratt of Decibel wrote that, while the song lacked many of the dynamics present in other songs from ...And Justice for All, it made up for it with "sheer energy, force, and confidence", further describing it as a song that sounded like a band being "very, very confident with what they're doing". Ashley Zlatopolsky of Billboard wrote that the song "reels you in with its pummeling guitar, fast tempo and frenzied drums", stating that the song hit the listener "fast-forward" on their senses. Some also praised the song's lyrics, with Sean Collins of Pitchfork comparing it with the closing song in the album, "Dyers Eve", which he viewed as similar.

Eamonn Stack of BBC Music stating that both it and another song on the album, "Frayed Ends of Sanity", were some of Metallica's finest works, with both being "full of ideas, crackling with aggression and neck-snapping hooks". "Blackened" has been highly ranked in several retrospective rankings of the band's discography created by music journalists, with Metal Hammer ranking it seventh, Kerrang! ranking it twelfth, Rolling Stone ranking it fifteenth, The A.V. Club ranking it nineteenth, and Spin ranking it twentieth. Metal Hammer also deemed it to be the best opening song from any Metallica album. "Blackened" has also been noted as a fan-favorite song by the band, with a 2014 readers poll conducted by Rolling Stone on the ten best songs by the band placing "Blackened" at seventh.

"Blackened" would later become the namesake for Metallica's independent record label, Blackened Recordings, which was established in 2012. It also became the source of the name for its alcohol brand, Blackened Whiskey.

== Live performances and other versions ==
"Blackened" is one of the most performed songs by Metallica from ...And Justice for All. As of June 2024, it is the third-most performed song live from the album. The song made its live debut on September 11, 1988, in Budapest, Hungary as part of the band's Damaged Justice tour. It later appeared on the set lists of other shows during the Damaged Justice tour, and on the set lists of several other subsequent Metallica tours. During some of the band's shows, such as those during their Wherever We May Roam Tour in 1991, the song was performed as part of a medley with several other songs from ...And Justice for All.

During the COVID-19 lockdowns in 2020, the band released an acoustic version of "Blackened" that was recorded over the course of a few days with each band member playing their parts separately in their homes. This version of the song, titled "Blackened 2020", was released as a single on May 15, 2020. The acoustic version of "Blackened" was later performed live as part of the band's Helping Hands concert in 2022, in support of their charity organization, the All Within My Hands Foundation. "Blackened" has also been covered by several other prominent musicians. A ukulele cover of the song was recorded and released by YouTuber Rob Scallon in 2016. In 2021, a version of "Blackened" recorded as part of a collaboration between the members of several other metal bands—specifically Mastodon's Troy Sanders, Bad Wolves' Doc Coyle, Spirit Adrift's Nate Garrett, and Carcass' Daniel Wilding—was released through the Two Minutes to Late Night YouTube channel. In 2023, Amos Heller, a bass player notable for his appearances on several albums and concert tours by Taylor Swift, released a cover of "Blackened" that featured audible bass.

== Personnel ==
Adapted from ...And Justice For All liner notes.

Metallica

- James Hetfield – vocals, rhythm guitar, harmony guitar, production
- Kirk Hammett – lead guitar
- Jason Newsted – bass
- Lars Ulrich – drums, production

Technical personnel

- Flemming Rasmussen – production, engineering
- Toby "Rage" Wright – assistant and additional engineering
- Steve Thompson – mixing
- Michael Barbiero – mixing
- George Cowan – assistant mixing engineer
- Bob Ludwig – mastering
- Reuben Cohen – 2018 remastering

== Certifications ==
Region	Certification	Certified units/sales
Australia (ARIA)	Gold	35,000^{‡}
New Zealand (RMNZ)	Gold	15,000^{‡}
United States (RIAA)	Gold	500,000^{‡}
^{‡} Sales+streaming figures based on certification alone.
