= Damaged Justice =

1988–1989 concert tour by Metallica

- Tour by Metallica
- Poster to the concert in Tulsa, Oklahoma
- Associated album: ...And Justice for All
- Start date: September 11, 1988
- End date: October 8, 1989
- Legs: 5
- No. of shows: 219

Metallica concert chronology
- Monsters of Rock '88 (1988); Damaged Justice (1988–1989); Tour 1990 (1990)

Damaged Justice was the fourth concert tour by the American heavy metal band Metallica. It began on September 11, 1988, and ended on October 8, 1989. The name is believed to be inspired either by the cover of its fourth studio album ...And Justice for All, or by the song "Damage, Inc." from the group's previous album, Master of Puppets. The single "One" was released during the tour.

== Itinerary ==
The Damaged Justice tour was Metallica's first full-length world tour with bassist Jason Newsted, who replaced Cliff Burton following the latter's death in 1986 as they were in the middle of touring behind Master of Puppets. It began in Europe on September 11, 1988, and Royal Air Force were the supporting act on the tour's first few dates. Metallica then played two Monsters of Rock shows in Spain with Iron Maiden, Anthrax and Helloween, and played a few headlining shows with Anthrax, before heading to the UK, where Danzig served as the opening act. Queensrÿche replaced Danzig for the remainder of the European leg and also served as the supporting act for the tour's first North American leg. Following this was Metallica's first tour of Australia, which included support by Mortal Sin. The Cult were the opening act for the second North American leg of the tour from May 31 to September 1, 1989, and were replaced by Faith No More for remaining tour dates. The Damaged Justice tour concluded with three shows in Brazil in October 1989.

The tour marked the first and, to date, only time that Metallica has played in the U.S. state of Delaware. On August 7, 1989, the band headlined a special and very drunken gig at Newark's Stone Balloon, with Wrathchild America as the supporting act.

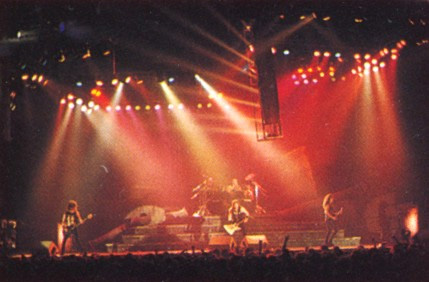
The line-up from left to right; Jason Newsted (bass), Lars Ulrich (drums), James Hetfield (lead vocals/rhythm guitar), Kirk Hammett (lead guitar).

== Recordings ==
The Damaged Justice tour was the first time the band had used live recordings of their concerts in single B-Sides and EP's (Those used on the Jump in the Fire single from 1984 were demos with faked audience noise dubbed over). The concert of February 5, 1989 was recorded and "For Whom the Bell Tolls", "Welcome Home (Sanitarium)", "Seek and Destroy" and "Creeping Death" were used as B-Sides for the "One" single in Europe and Japan, as well as the majority of the concert being re-released as part of Fan Can 4.

Both of the August 29 and 30, 1989, shows in Seattle were also recorded and "Harvester of Sorrow", "One", "Breadfan" and "Last Caress" were used for The Good, The Bad and The Live. The same mix of these shows used here was used on the digital re-masters of the band's first four albums when uploaded to digital retailers, though a different set of songs were used in this case, two from the respective album. In 1993, these concerts were re-mixed and released as video in the box set Live Shit: Binge & Purge.

In 2020, Metallica released a live concert video of the Irvine show.

== Tour dates ==
List of 1988 concerts
Date	City	Country	Venue
September 11, 1988	Budapest	Hungary	MTK Football Stadium
September 13, 1988	Padua	Italy	Palasport
September 14, 1988	Milan	Italy	Palatrussardi
September 15, 1988	Bern	Switzerland	Festhalle
September 17, 1988	Pamplona	Spain	Plaza de Toros de Pamplona
September 18, 1988	Madrid	Spain	Casa de Campo
September 20, 1988	Toulon	France	Espace Culture des Lices
September 21, 1988	Montpellier	France	Zénith Sud
September 22, 1988	Barcelona	Spain	La Monumental
September 24, 1988	Edinburgh	Scotland	Edinburgh Playhouse
September 25, 1988	Edinburgh	Scotland	Edinburgh Playhouse
September 26, 1988	Bradford	England	St George's Hall
September 28, 1988	Newport	Wales	Newport Centre
September 29, 1988	Birmingham	England	NEC Arena
September 30, 1988	Sheffield	England	Sheffield City Hall
October 1, 1988	Antrim	Northern Ireland	Antrim Forum
October 3, 1988	Dublin	Ireland	Top Hat
October 4, 1988	Dublin	Ireland	Top Hat
October 6, 1988	Newcastle	England	Newcastle City Hall
October 8, 1988	Manchester	England	Manchester Apollo
October 9, 1988	London	England	Hammersmith Odeon
October 10, 1988	London	England	Hammersmith Odeon
October 11, 1988	London	England	Hammersmith Odeon
October 13, 1988	Copenhagen	Denmark	K.B. Hallen
October 15, 1988	Helsinki	Finland	Helsinki Ice Hall
October 17, 1988	Stockholm	Sweden	Solnahallen
October 18, 1988	Oslo	Norway	Skedsmohallen
October 19, 1988	Gothenburg	Sweden	Frölundaborg
October 21, 1988	Munich	West Germany	Rudi-Sedlmayer-Halle
October 22, 1988	Saarbrücken	West Germany	Saarlandhalle
October 23, 1988	Würzburg	West Germany	Carl-Diem-Halle
October 24, 1988	Hanover	West Germany	Niedersachsenhalle
October 26, 1988	Cologne	West Germany	Sporthalle
October 27, 1988	Dortmund	West Germany	Westfalenhallen
October 28, 1988	Heidelberg	West Germany	Rhein-Neckar-Halle
October 29, 1988	Brussels	Belgium	Forest National
October 31, 1988	Paris	France	Le Zénith
November 1, 1988	Frankfurt	West Germany	Festhalle Frankfurt
November 2, 1988	Stuttgart	West Germany	Schleyerhalle
November 3, 1988	Regensburg	West Germany	Donauhalle
November 5, 1988	Leiden	Netherlands	Groenoordhallen
November 15, 1988	Toledo, Ohio	United States	Toledo Sports Arena
November 17, 1988	Chicago, Illinois	United States	UIC Pavilion
November 18, 1988	Cincinnati, Ohio	United States	Cincinnati Gardens
November 19, 1988	Columbus, Ohio	United States	Battelle Hall
November 21, 1988	Madison, Wisconsin	United States	Dane County Coliseum
November 22, 1988	Milwaukee, Wisconsin	United States	MECCA Arena
November 24, 1988	Indianapolis, Indiana	United States	Market Square Arena
November 25, 1988	Detroit, Michigan	United States	Cobo Arena
November 26, 1988	Richfield, Ohio	United States	Richfield Coliseum
November 28, 1988	St. Louis, Missouri	United States	Kiel Auditorium
November 29, 1988	Kansas City, Missouri	United States	Municipal Auditorium
November 30, 1988	Oklahoma City, Oklahoma	United States	Myriad Convention Center
December 2, 1988	Albuquerque, New Mexico	United States	Tingley Coliseum
December 4, 1988	Phoenix, Arizona	United States	Arizona Veterans Memorial Coliseum
December 5, 1988	San Diego, California	United States	San Diego Sports Arena
December 7, 1988	Long Beach, California	United States	Long Beach Arena
December 8, 1988	Long Beach, California	United States	Long Beach Arena
December 10, 1988	Daly City, California	United States	Cow Palace
December 11, 1988	Daly City, California	United States	Cow Palace
December 12, 1988	Sacramento, California	United States	ARCO Arena
December 14, 1988	Fresno, California	United States	Selland Arena
December 16, 1988	Salt Lake City, Utah	United States	Salt Palace
December 18, 1988	Denver, Colorado	United States	McNichols Sports Arena

List of 1989 concerts
Date	City	Country	Venue
January 11, 1989	Knoxville, Tennessee	United States	Knoxville Civic Coliseum
January 13, 1989	Memphis, Tennessee	United States	Mid-South Coliseum
January 14, 1989	Birmingham, Alabama	United States	Birmingham–Jefferson Convention Complex
January 15, 1989	New Orleans, Louisiana	United States	Lakefront Arena
January 17, 1989	Waco, Texas	United States	Heart O' Texas Coliseum
January 18, 1989	Odessa, Texas	United States	Ector County Coliseum
January 20, 1989	Lubbock, Texas	United States	City Bank Coliseum
January 21, 1989	El Paso, Texas	United States	El Paso County Coliseum
January 22, 1989	Amarillo, Texas	United States	Amarillo Civic Center
January 24, 1989	Beaumont, Texas	United States	Beaumont Civic Center
January 25, 1989	Corpus Christi, Texas	United States	Memorial Coliseum
January 27, 1989	Shreveport, Louisiana	United States	Hirsch Memorial Coliseum
January 28, 1989	Tulsa, Oklahoma	United States	Expo Square Pavilion
January 31, 1989	Abilene, Texas	United States	Taylor County Expo Center
February 1, 1989	San Antonio, Texas	United States	Convention Center Arena
February 3, 1989	Austin, Texas	United States	Frank Erwin Center
February 4, 1989	Houston, Texas	United States	The Summit
February 5, 1989	Dallas, Texas	United States	Reunion Arena
February 7, 1989	Little Rock, Arkansas	United States	Barton Coliseum
February 8, 1989	Huntsville, Alabama	United States	Von Braun Civic Center
February 10, 1989	Lakeland, Florida	United States	Lakeland Civic Center
February 11, 1989	Daytona Beach, Florida	United States	Ocean Center
February 12, 1989	Miami, Florida	United States	James L. Knight Center
February 14, 1989	North Fort Myers, Florida	United States	Lee County Civic Center
February 15, 1989	West Palm Beach, Florida	United States	West Palm Beach Auditorium
February 17, 1989	Jacksonville, Florida	United States	Jacksonville Memorial Coliseum
February 18, 1989	Atlanta, Georgia	United States	The Omni
February 19, 1989	Greensboro, North Carolina	United States	Greensboro Coliseum
February 25, 1989	Fayetteville, North Carolina	United States	Cumberland County Auditorium
February 26, 1989	Charlotte, North Carolina	United States	Charlotte Coliseum
February 27, 1989	Savannah, Georgia	United States	Savannah Civic Center
March 1, 1989	East Rutherford, New Jersey	United States	Brendan Byrne Arena
March 2, 1989	Bethlehem, Pennsylvania	United States	Stabler Arena
March 4, 1989	Pittsburgh, Pennsylvania	United States	Pittsburgh Civic Arena
March 5, 1989	Binghamton, New York	United States	Broome County Veterans Memorial Arena
March 7, 1989	Rochester, New York	United States	Rochester Community War Memorial
March 8, 1989	Uniondale, New York	United States	Nassau Coliseum
March 9, 1989	Landover, Maryland	United States	Capital Centre
March 11, 1989	Norfolk, Virginia	United States	Norfolk Scope
March 12, 1989	Philadelphia, Pennsylvania	United States	The Spectrum
March 13, 1989	Buffalo, New York	United States	Buffalo Memorial Auditorium
March 15, 1989	Troy, New York	United States	RPI Field House
March 16, 1989	Worcester, Massachusetts	United States	The Centrum
March 17, 1989	Hartford, Connecticut	United States	Hartford Civic Center
March 18, 1989	Syracuse, New York	United States	War Memorial at Oncenter
March 29, 1989	Providence, Rhode Island	United States	Providence Civic Center
March 30, 1989	Portland, Maine	United States	Cumberland County Civic Center
April 1, 1989	Moncton, New Brunswick	Canada	Moncton Coliseum
April 3, 1989	Sydney, Nova Scotia	Canada	Centre 200
April 4, 1989	Halifax, Nova Scotia	Canada	Halifax Metro Centre
April 6, 1989	Ottawa, Ontario	Canada	Ottawa Civic Centre
April 7, 1989	Toronto, Ontario	Canada	Maple Leaf Gardens
April 8, 1989	Hamilton, Ontario	Canada	Copps Coliseum
April 10, 1989	Quebec City, Quebec	Canada	Colisée de Québec
April 11, 1989	Chicoutimi, Quebec	Canada	Centre Georges-Vézina
April 12, 1989	Montreal, Quebec	Canada	Montreal Forum
April 14, 1989	Battle Creek, Michigan	United States	Kellogg Arena
April 15, 1989	Saginaw, Michigan	United States	Wendler Arena
April 16, 1989	Trotwood, Ohio	United States	Hara Arena
April 18, 1989	Peoria, Illinois	United States	Peoria Civic Center
April 19, 1989	Ashwaubenon, Wisconsin	United States	Brown County Veterans Memorial Arena
April 20, 1989	La Crosse, Wisconsin	United States	La Crosse Center
April 21, 1989	Bloomington, Minnesota	United States	Met Center
May 1, 1989	Auckland	New Zealand	Logan Campbell Center
May 3, 1989	Adelaide	Australia	Thebarton Theatre
May 4, 1989	Melbourne	Australia	Festival Hall
May 6, 1989	Sydney	Australia	Hordern Pavilion
May 11, 1989	Kawasaki	Japan	Sangyo Bunka Kaikan
May 13, 1989	Tokyo	Japan	Yoyogi National Gymnasium
May 14, 1989	Tokyo	Japan	Yoyogi National Gymnasium
May 16, 1989	Osaka	Japan	Koseinekin Hall
May 17, 1989	Osaka	Japan	Koseinekin Hall
May 18, 1989	Nagoya	Japan	Shi Kokaido
May 24, 1989	Honolulu, Hawaii	United States	Neal S. Blaisdell Center
May 27, 1989	Anchorage, Alaska	United States	Sullivan Arena
May 31, 1989	Vancouver, British Columbia	Canada	PNE Expo Center
June 2, 1989	Edmonton, Alberta	Canada	Northlands Coliseum
June 3, 1989	Calgary, Alberta	Canada	Saddledome
June 4, 1989	Saskatoon, Saskatchewan	Canada	Saskatchewan Place
June 6, 1989	Winnipeg, Manitoba	Canada	Winnipeg Arena
June 7, 1989	Minot, North Dakota	United States	Minot Municipal Auditorium
June 8, 1989	Duluth, Minnesota	United States	Duluth Arena Auditorium
June 10, 1989	Bloomington, Minnesota	United States	Met Center
June 11, 1989	Ames, Iowa	United States	Hilton Coliseum
June 13, 1989	Sioux Falls, South Dakota	United States	Sioux Falls Arena
June 14, 1989	Omaha, Nebraska	United States	Omaha Civic Auditorium
June 16, 1989	Rapid City, South Dakota	United States	Rushmore Plaza Civic Center
June 17, 1989	Bismarck, North Dakota	United States	Bismarck Civic Center
June 18, 1989	Grand Forks, North Dakota	United States	Hyslop Sports Center
June 20, 1989	Cedar Rapids, Iowa	United States	Five Seasons Center
June 21, 1989	Bonner Springs, Kansas	United States	Sandstone Amphitheatre
June 22, 1989	Springfield, Illinois	United States	Prairie Capital Convention Center
June 24, 1989	East Troy, Wisconsin	United States	Alpine Valley Music Theatre
June 25, 1989	Fort Wayne, Indiana	United States	Allen County War Memorial Coliseum
June 27, 1989	Evansville, Indiana	United States	Roberts Municipal Stadium
June 28, 1989	Louisville, Kentucky	United States	Louisville Gardens
June 29, 1989	Noblesville, Indiana	United States	Deer Creek Music Center
July 1, 1989	Mears, Michigan	United States	Val du Lakes Amphitheatre
July 3, 1989	Clarkston, Michigan	United States	Pine Knob Music Theatre
July 4, 1989	Clarkston, Michigan	United States	Pine Knob Music Theatre
July 5, 1989	Cincinnati, Ohio	United States	Riverbend Music Center
July 7, 1989	Hoffman Estates, Illinois	United States	Poplar Creek Music Theater
July 8, 1989	Richfield, Ohio	United States	Richfield Coliseum
July 9, 1989	Charleston, West Virginia	United States	Charleston Civic Center
July 11, 1989	Pittsburgh, Pennsylvania	United States	Pittsburgh Civic Arena
July 12, 1989	Harrisburg, Pennsylvania	United States	City Island
July 14, 1989	Middletown, New York	United States	Orange County Fairgrounds
July 15, 1989	Manchester, New Hampshire	United States	Riverfront Park
July 16, 1989	Weedsport, New York	United States	Cayuga County Fair Speedway
July 18, 1989	Bristol, Connecticut	United States	Lake Compounce
July 19, 1989	Philadelphia, Pennsylvania	United States	The Spectrum
July 21, 1989	East Rutherford, New Jersey	United States	Brendan Byrne Arena
July 22, 1989	East Rutherford, New Jersey	United States	Brendan Byrne Arena
July 23, 1989	Uniondale, New York	United States	Nassau Veterans Memorial Coliseum
July 25, 1989	Worcester, Massachusetts	United States	The Centrum
July 26, 1989	Burlington, Vermont	United States	Burlington Memorial Auditorium
July 28, 1989	Landover, Maryland	United States	Capital Centre
July 29, 1989	Allentown, Pennsylvania	United States	Great Allentown Fair
July 30, 1989	Richmond, Virginia	United States	Richmond Coliseum
August 7, 1989	Newark, Delaware	United States	Stone Balloon
August 8, 1989	Roanoke, Virginia	United States	Roanoke Civic Center
August 9, 1989	Columbia, South Carolina	United States	Carolina Coliseum
August 11, 1989	Johnson City, Tennessee	United States	Freedom Hall Civic Center
August 12, 1989	Thornville, Ohio	United States	Buckeye Lake Music Center
August 13, 1989	Greenville, South Carolina	United States	Greenville Memorial Auditorium
August 15, 1989	Chattanooga, Tennessee	United States	UTC Arena
August 16, 1989	Nashville, Tennessee	United States	Starwood Amphitheatre
August 18, 1989	Atlanta, Georgia	United States	Lakewood Amphitheatre
August 19, 1989	Jackson, Mississippi	United States	Mississippi Coliseum
August 20, 1989	Biloxi, Mississippi	United States	Mississippi Coast Coliseum
August 22, 1989	Houston, Texas	United States	The Summit
August 23, 1989	Dallas, Texas	United States	Starplex Amphitheatre
August 25, 1989	Morrison, Colorado	United States	Red Rocks Amphitheatre
August 26, 1989	Morrison, Colorado	United States	Red Rocks Amphitheatre
August 28, 1989	Spokane, Washington	United States	Spokane Coliseum
August 29, 1989	Seattle, Washington	United States	Seattle Center Coliseum
August 30, 1989	Seattle, Washington	United States	Seattle Center Coliseum
September 1, 1989	Portland, Oregon	United States	Memorial Coliseum
September 3, 1989	Boise, Idaho	United States	Boise State University Pavilion
September 5, 1989	Billings, Montana	United States	MetraPark Arena
September 6, 1989	Casper, Wyoming	United States	Casper Events Center
September 8, 1989	Salt Lake City, Utah	United States	Salt Palace
September 9, 1989	Paradise, Nevada	United States	Thomas & Mack Center
September 10, 1989	Chandler, Arizona	United States	Compton Terrace Amphitheatre
September 12, 1989	Reno, Nevada	United States	Lawlor Events Center
September 14, 1989	Concord, California	United States	Concord Pavilion
September 15, 1989	Mountain View, California	United States	Shoreline Amphitheatre
September 16, 1989	Sacramento, California	United States	California Exposition & State Fair
September 19, 1989	Tucson, Arizona	United States	Tucson Community Center
September 21, 1989	Irvine, California	United States	Irvine Meadows Amphitheatre
September 22, 1989	Irvine, California	United States	Irvine Meadows Amphitheatre
September 23, 1989	Irvine, California	United States	Irvine Meadows Amphitheatre
October 4, 1989	Rio de Janeiro	Brazil	Maracanã Arena
October 6, 1989	São Paulo	Brazil	Ibirapuera Gymnasium
October 7, 1989	São Paulo	Brazil	Ibirapuera Gymnasium

== Personnel ==
- James Hetfield – lead vocals, rhythm guitar
- Kirk Hammett – lead guitar, backing vocals
- Lars Ulrich – drums
- Jason Newsted – bass, backing vocals
