= ...And Justice for All (song) =

Promotional single by Metallica

from the album ...And Justice for All
- B-side: "...And Justice for All (LP Version)"
- Released: September 6, 1988
- Recorded: January–May 1988
- Studio: One on One, Los Angeles
- Genre: Progressive metal; thrash metal
- Length: 9:46 (album version); 5:59 (radio edit)
- Label: Elektra
- Composers: James Hetfield; Lars Ulrich; Kirk Hammett
- Lyricist: James Hetfield
- Producers: Flemming Rasmussen; James Hetfield; Lars Ulrich

Metallica singles chronology
| "Harvester of Sorrow" (1988) | "...And Justice for All" (1988) | "Eye of the Beholder" (1988) |

"...And Justice for All" is a song by American heavy metal band Metallica. It is the second track on the band's album of the same name, and was released as a promotional single in 1988. Like the album it features on, it is named after the last four words of the Pledge of Allegiance.

== Music and lyrics ==
The main riff of the song is based on a drum pattern written by Lars Ulrich. Music critic Cosmo Lee said that it is "a linkage of blocks" rather than "a progressive opus", because "the song is mid-paced and very playable. None of the riffs are that technical."

"...And Justice for All" features lyrics about corruption in the government. The song title is the last four words of the Pledge of Allegiance. The lyrics refer to injustice, as "money tips [the] scales" of "Lady Justice". Especially during the chorus, "Pulling your strings, justice is done" as the ultimate symbol of a miscarried justice.

== Live performances ==
The song was performed live by the band during their Damaged Justice world tour in support of the parent album. After the tour, the band vowed to never play it again. Guitarist Kirk Hammett noted that the length of the songs was problematic for fans and for the band: "Touring behind it, we realized that the general consensus was that songs were too fucking long. One day after we played "Justice" and got off the stage one of us said, 'we're never fucking playing that song again.'" However, Metallica played the track in the opening show of the Sick of the Studio '07 tour, for the first time since October 1989, and made it a set-fixture for the remainder of that tour. The song was occasionally played during the World Magnetic tour and was played nearly every night during the By Request tour in 2014. However, following that, the song was not played for over twelve years until the opening night of the band's Life Burns Faster residency. When played live, the intro of the song is played as a recording due to the intro requiring three guitars. A statue of Lady Justice is commonly placed on the scene, to be torn down as the song approaches its conclusion. A live performance of the complete song appears on the DVD Orgullo, Pasión y Gloria, recorded in Mexico City during the World Magnetic Tour.

== Track listing ==
Promotional vinyl
| No. | Title | Length |
|---|---|---|
| 1. | "...And Justice for All" (Edit) | 5:59 |
| 2. | "...And Justice for All" (LP Version) | 9:46 |

== Video games ==
The song is featured in the Metallica 3-Pack that is downloadable content for the music video game Rock Band 3. It was made available to download on March 1, 2011, in an updated version for use in Rock Band 3 Pro mode which takes advantage of the use of a real guitar / bass guitar, along with standard MIDI-compatible electronic drum kits in addition to vocals.

== Personnel ==
Credits adapted from the parent album's liner notes.

Metallica

- James Hetfield – vocals, rhythm guitar, harmony guitar, production
- Kirk Hammett – lead guitar
- Jason Newsted – bass
- Lars Ulrich – drums, production

Technical Personnel

- Flemming Rasmussen – production, engineering
- Toby "Rage" Wright – assistant and additional engineering
- Steve Thompson, Michael Barbiero – mixing
- George Cowan – assistant mixing engineer
- Bob Ludwig – mastering
- George Marino – 1995 remastering
- Reuben Cohen – 2018 remastering

Artwork

- James Hetfield, Lars Ulrich – cover concept
- Stephen Gorman – cover illustration
- Ross "Tobacco Road" Halfin – photography
- Pushead – hammer illustration
- Reiner Design Consultants, Inc. – design, layout

== Certifications ==
Certifications for "...And Justice for All"
| Region | Certification | Certified units/sales |
|---|---|---|
| United States (RIAA) | Gold | 500,000^{‡} |
^{‡} Sales+streaming figures based on certification alone.
