= Harvester of Sorrow =

1988 Metallica song

Single by Metallica

from the album ...And Justice for All
- B-side: "Breadfan"; "The Prince"
- Released: August 28, 1988
- Recorded: 1988
- Studio: One on One (Los Angeles)
- Genre: Thrash metal; heavy metal; groove metal
- Length: 5:45
- Label: Elektra
- Composers: James Hetfield; Lars Ulrich
- Lyricist: James Hetfield
- Producers: Flemming Rasmussen; James Hetfield; Lars Ulrich

Metallica singles chronology
"Master of Puppets" (1986)	"Harvester of Sorrow" (1988)	"...And Justice for All" (1988)

"Harvester of Sorrow" is a song by the American heavy metal band Metallica. It was released on August 28, 1988, as the first single from their fourth studio album, ...And Justice for All (1988). The song debuted at a live performance prior to the release of ...And Justice for All while the band was on the summer Monsters of Rock Tour in 1988 with Van Halen, Scorpions, Dokken and Kingdom Come. It was their first single featuring bassist Jason Newsted following his predecessor Cliff Burton's death.

The single contained two B-sides, both of which were cover songs: "Breadfan", originally by Budgie, and "The Prince", originally by Diamond Head. There was an error in the mastering of the recording: At the end of "Breadfan", a distorted voice can be heard saying "Mommy, where's Fluffy?". This was actually intended to be the intro to the next track, "The Prince". However, it was separated in the wrong place. The band decided not to correct this error when the tracks were included on their 1998 Garage Inc. compilation.

== Composition and lyrics ==
"Harvester of Sorrow" is a thrash metal song that is five minutes and forty-five seconds long. It is played at an average tempo of 92 to 93 beats per minute. The pre-verse and verse riffs were originally from James Hetfield's 1987 demo for the song "Dyers Eve". After deciding that the riff did not fit within "Dyers Eve", the band demoed it within "Blackened", before eventually recording "Harvester of Sorrow" in 1988.

The song's subject matter refers to a man who is traumatically abused during his childhood, descends into alcoholism and drug addiction, and takes out his anger on his family. At the end of the song, it is implied his sanity snaps and he murders them.

== Cover versions ==
The song was covered by San Francisco–area punk rock band Link 80 for the 2000 compilation album Punk Goes Metal. Apocalyptica covered the song for the A Tribute to the Four Horsemen cover album. German electronic group Funker Vogt also covered the song on The Blackest Album Vol. 3 tribute album.

== Personnel ==
Personnel adapted from the ...And Justice for All liner notes

Metallica

- James Hetfield – vocals, rhythm guitar, production
- Kirk Hammett – lead guitar
- Lars Ulrich – drums, production
- Jason Newsted – bass

Technical personnel

- Flemming Rasmussen – production, engineering
- Toby "Rage" Wright – assistant and additional engineering
- Steve Thompson, Michael Barbiero – mixing
- George Cowan – assistant mixing engineer
- Bob Ludwig – mastering
- George Marino – 1995 remastering
- Reuben Cohen – 2018 remastering

== Release history ==
Region	Date	Format	Label
United Kingdom	August 19, 1988	CD, vinyl	Elektra
United States	August 28, 1988	CD, vinyl	Elektra

== Chart positions ==
Chart (1988)	Peak position
Australian (ARIA) Singles Chart	100
Ireland (IRMA)	19
New Zealand (Recorded Music NZ)	30
Spain (AFYVE)	11
UK Singles (Official Charts)	20
