= Welcome Home (Sanitarium) =

1986 song by Metallica

Song by Metallica

from the album Master of Puppets
- A-side: "Master of Puppets"
- Released: October 23, 1986
- Recorded: 1985
- Studio: Sweet Silence (Copenhagen, Denmark)
- Genre: Thrash metal; heavy metal
- Length: 6:28
- Label: Elektra
- Composers: James Hetfield; Lars Ulrich; Kirk Hammett
- Lyricist: James Hetfield
- Producers: Metallica; Flemming Rasmussen

Audio sample
- file; help

"Welcome Home (Sanitarium)" is a song by the American heavy metal band Metallica from their third studio album Master of Puppets (1986). The song was covered by several bands and artists including Apocalyptica, Bullet for My Valentine, Thunderstone, and Scott D. Davis.

== Composition ==
"Welcome Home (Sanitarium)" was based on Ken Kesey's novel One Flew Over the Cuckoo's Nest and conveys the thoughts of a patient unjustly caged in a mental institution. The song's subject matter is madness and serves as a metaphor for honesty and truth. According to philosopher William Irwin, "Welcome Home (Sanitarium)" is perhaps the most revealing of Metallica's songs dealing with insanity.

The song opens with a section of clean single strings and harmonics. The clean, arpeggiated main riff is played in alternating 4/4 and 6/4 time signatures. The song is structured with alternating somber clean guitars in the verses, and distorted heavy riffing in the choruses, unfolding into an aggressive finale. This structure follows a pattern of power ballads Metallica set with "Fade to Black" on Ride the Lightning and would follow with "One" on ...And Justice for All and later "The Day That Never Comes" on Death Magnetic.

Similarities have been drawn in the music press between the song's intro and the 1980 Bleak House track "Rainbow Warrior", with an article in The Sunday Times stating Metallica had "borrowed" the riff.

== Live performances ==
"Welcome Home (Sanitarium)" is the second-most performed song from Master of Puppets behind the title track. Both tracks along with "Battery" and "Damage, Inc." were featured on the nine-song set list for the album's promotional tour. Those songs were all revived for the band's concerts in 1997 and 1998, after having been retired for a number of years.

== Legacy ==
Weezer frontman Rivers Cuomo revealed "Undone – The Sweater Song" was "almost a complete rip-off" of "Welcome Home (Sanitarium)".

== Personnel ==
Credits are adapted from Master of Puppets' liner notes.

Metallica

- James Hetfield – rhythm guitar, vocals
- Lars Ulrich – drums, percussion
- Kirk Hammett – lead guitar
- Cliff Burton – bass, backing vocals

Production

- Metallica – production
- Flemming Rasmussen – production, engineering
- Andy Wroblewski – assistant engineer
- Michael Wagener – mixing
- Mark Wilzcak – assistant mixing engineer

== Certifications ==
Region	Certification	Certified units/sales
Australia (ARIA)	Gold	35,000^{‡}
United States (RIAA)	Gold	500,000^{‡}
^{‡} Sales+streaming figures based on certification alone.
