= ...And Justice for All (album) =

Studio album by Metallica
- Released: September 7, 1988 (Note: The Recording Industry Association of America lists the release date as August 25, 1988, as does Metallica's official SoundCloud page and the streaming services Spotify and Apple Music. According to Benoît Clerc, the album was released on September 5 in the UK by Phonogram/Vertigo Records and the following day in the US by Elektra/Asylum Records; author Mick Wall lists the date as September 5, and Guitar World lists September 6. Metallica's website lists the date as September 7.)
- Recorded: January 30 – May 23, 1988
- Studio: One on One (Los Angeles)
- Genres: Thrash metal; progressive metal; technical thrash metal
- Length: 65:24
- Label: Elektra
- Producers: James Hetfield; Flemming Rasmussen; Lars Ulrich

Metallica chronology
The $5.98 E.P. – Garage Days Re-Revisited (1987)	...And Justice for All (1988)	Metallica (1991)

Singles from ...And Justice for All
- 1. "Harvester of Sorrow" Released: August 28, 1988; 2. "Eye of the Beholder" Released: October 30, 1988; 3. "One" Released: January 10, 1989

...And Justice for All is the fourth studio album by the American heavy metal band Metallica, released on September 7, 1988, by Elektra Records. It was Metallica's first full-length studio album to feature bassist Jason Newsted following the death of Cliff Burton in 1986. Burton received posthumous co-writing credit on "To Live Is to Die".

Metallica recorded the album with producer Flemming Rasmussen over four months in early 1988 at One on One Recording Studios in Los Angeles. It features aggressive complexity, fast tempos, and few verse-chorus structures. The lyrics cover themes of political and legal injustices, government corruption, censorship, and war. The cover depicts Lady Justice bound in ropes with dollar bills from her scales. The album title is derived from the last four words of the American Pledge of Allegiance.

To further promote ...And Justice for All, the band embarked on the Damaged Justice tour, and released three singles. "Harvester of Sorrow" reached the top 20 in the UK singles chart, and "One"—and the band's first music video—garnered significant airplay. The album topped the charts in Finland and received multi-platinum certifications in Australia, Canada and Germany. In the United States, the album reached number six on the Billboard 200 and was certified eight-times platinum by the Recording Industry Association of America in 2003.

...And Justice for All was acclaimed for its depth and complexity, although its dry mix and nearly inaudible bass guitar were criticized. It was included in The Village Voice's annual Pazz & Jop critics' poll of the year's best albums, and was nominated for a Grammy Award in 1989, controversially losing out to Jethro Tull in the Best Hard Rock/Metal Performance Vocal or Instrumental category. Retrospective reviews rank it among Metallica's best works. It was remastered and reissued as an expanded box set in 2018.

== Background ==
...And Justice for All is the first Metallica album to feature bassist Jason Newsted after the death of Cliff Burton in 1986; Newsted had previously played on the 1987 Metallica EP The $5.98 E.P. – Garage Days Re-Revisited. Metallica had intended to record the album earlier, but was sidetracked by the large number of festival dates scheduled for the summer of 1987, including the European leg of the Monsters of Rock festival. Another reason was frontman James Hetfield's arm injury in a skateboarding accident.

Metallica's previous studio album, Master of Puppets (1986), was their last under their contract with the record label Music for Nations. Manager Peter Mensch wanted them to sign with British record distributor Phonogram Records. Phonogram manager Martin Hooker offered them "well over £1 million, which at that time was the biggest deal we'd ever offered anyone". He explained that the final figure for combined British and European sales of all three Metallica albums was more than 1.5 million copies.

== Recording ==
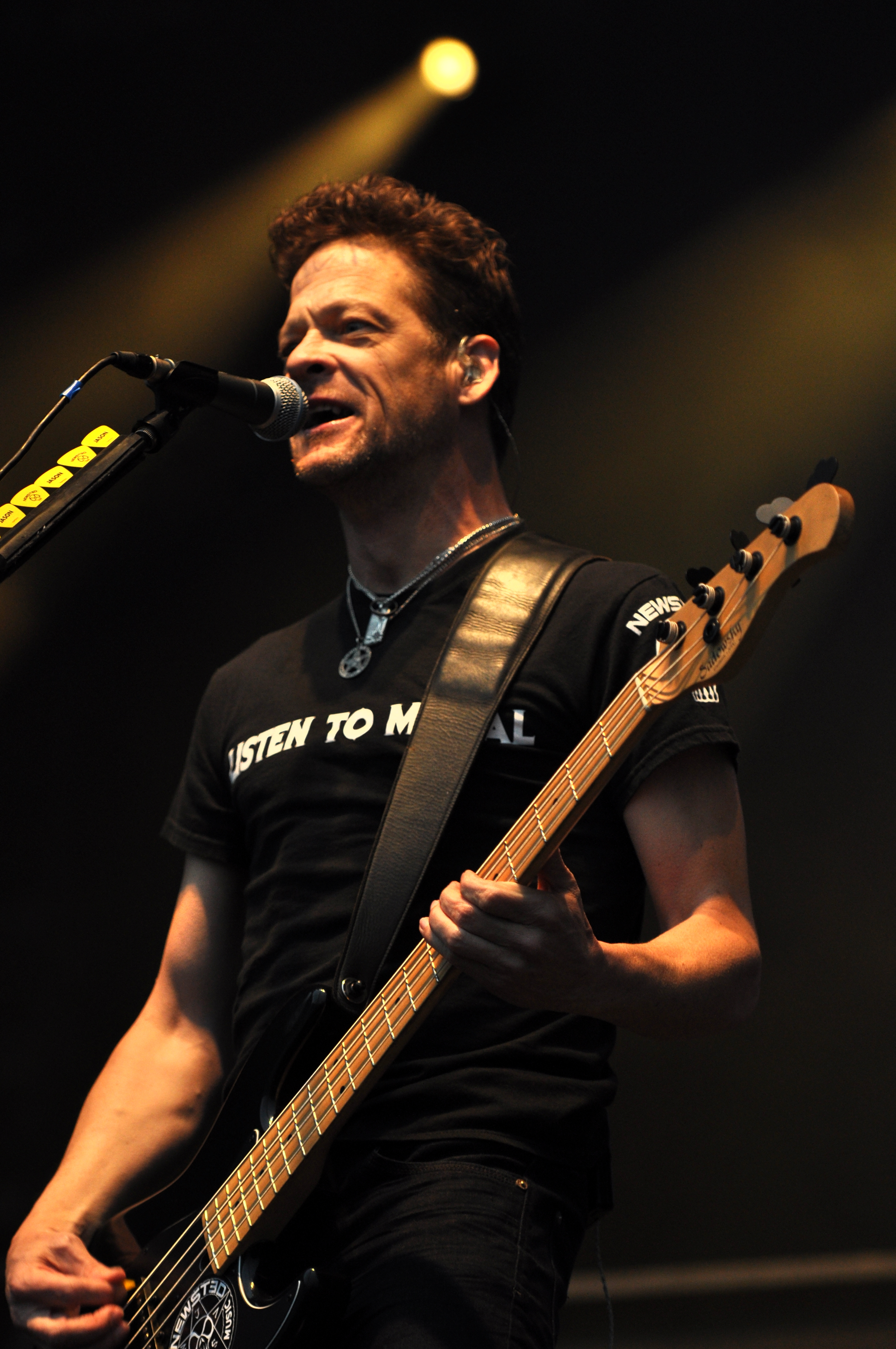
...And Justice for All was Metallica's first studio album to feature bassist Jason Newsted (pictured in 2013). His bass parts are noticeably inaudible in the mixes.

...And Justice for All was recorded from January 30 to May 23, 1988 at One on One Recording Studios in Los Angeles. Metallica produced it with Flemming Rasmussen. Rasmussen was initially unavailable for the planned start in late January 1988, so the band hired Mike Clink, who had caught their attention for producing the debut Guns N' Roses album Appetite for Destruction (1987). However, the sessions did not go well. Clink felt that he and the band were not comfortable working together, with Clink having less influence than he liked: "As much as I believe they wanted me to put my magic on the tracks, I think that they were used to doing things on their own and doing it their own way."

Despite this, the sessions with Clink were not completely wasted; rather, the band spent time warming up and fine-tuning sounds in the studio ahead of Rasmussen's arrival to start the record properly. Two cover songs were recorded—Budgie's "Breadfan" and Diamond Head's "The Prince"—for use as B-sides, as well as drum tracks for "The Shortest Straw" and "Harvester of Sorrow" which were kept.

Rasmussen took over from Clink and joined the recording process six weeks in, in March. His first task was to adjust the guitar sound, with which the band was dissatisfied. Each song started with a click track and Hetfield's guide guitar part, mapping the song structure and tempo changes. From there, the band would record each instrument separately – Ulrich's drums, followed by Hetfield's final rhythm guitar parts, Newsted's bass parts and then vocals and Hammett's lead guitars in the final stages. Hetfield wrote lyrics during the recording sessions; these were occasionally unfinished as recording began, and Rasmussen said that Hetfield "wasn't really interested in singing" but instead "wanted that hard vibe". Metallica's recording process was new to Newsted, who questioned his impact on the overall sound and the lack of discussion with the rest of the team. He recorded his parts separately, with only the assistant engineer present. The experience differed from his previous band, Flotsam and Jetsam, whose style he described as "basically everybody playing the same thing like a sonic wall".

=== Mixing ===
...And Justice for All is noted for its "dry, sterile" production. Rasmussen said that was not his intention, as he tried for an ambient sound similar to the previous two albums. He was not present during the album's mixing, for which Steve Thompson and Michael Barbiero had been hired beforehand. Rasmussen observed that, in his absence from the mixing process, Thompson and Barbiero used only the close microphones on drums for the mix and none of the room microphones, causing the "clicking", thin drum sound. The bass guitar is nearly inaudible, while the guitars sound "strangled mechanistic". He saw the "synthetic" percussion as another reason for the compressed sound.

At Hetfield and Ulrich's instruction, Newsted's bass guitar was made almost inaudible. According to Rasmussen, "After Lars and James heard their initial mixes the first thing they said was, 'Take the bass down so you can just hear it, and then once you've done that, take it down a further three dBs.' I have no idea why they wanted that, but it was totally out of my hands." In 2009, Hetfield said that the bass was obscured as the basslines often doubled his rhythm guitar, making the instruments indiscernible, and because his "scooped" guitar sound took a lot of low-end frequencies. As per Newsted, the bass sound achieved had little low end to begin with, with Hammett adding that it interfered with Hetfield's guitar sound when blended, so they turned the bass down.

Newsted was not satisfied with the final mix and was unhappy that the bass was inaudible. Thompson was also unhappy, and blamed Ulrich for the decision; he tried to quit the project, but was blocked by management. Rasmussen said in 2018, "I'm probably one of the only people in the world, including Jason and Toby Wright, the assistant engineer, who heard the bass tracks on ...And Justice for All, and they are fucking brilliant." In 2019, Hetfield and Ulrich said they had mixed the bass low not to belittle Newsted, but because their hearing was "shot" following heavy touring and so they "basically kept turning everything else up until the bass disappeared". Newsted said they did not fully understand at the time how frequencies worked in the mix.

Fans have remixed the album using audio equalization or by adding their own bass parts, such as the ...And Justice for Jason project uploaded to YouTube. Rolling Stone's Kory Grow noted how the bass parts were separated in the mix for the video game Guitar Hero: Metallica, which Grow believed some fans used for their own remixes. In 2013, Newsted received a remix of the album with the bass parts intact from a fan; while showing appreciation for the effort, he believed the right version of the album was released. In 2026, he said that the album should never be officially remixed.

== Composition ==
=== Music ===
We took the Ride the Lightning and Master of Puppets concept as far as we could take it. There was no place else to go with the progressive, nutty, sideways side of Metallica, and I'm so proud of the fact that, in some way, that album is kind of the epitome of that progressive side of us up through the '80s.

— Lars Ulrich, on the band's direction for the album

This is completely sublimated rock, on a quest for a purity of form, light years beyond raunch or blues rock. Metallica turn heavy metal's melodrama into algebra. This isn't thrash, but thresh: mechanized mayhem. There's no blur, no mess, not even at peak velocity, but a rigorous grid of incisions and contusions.

— Simon Reynolds, on the album's music

A thrash metal and progressive metal record, ...And Justice for All is a musically progressive album featuring long and complex songs, fast tempos and few verse-chorus structures. Metallica decided to broaden its sonic range, writing songs with multiple sections, heavy guitar arpeggios and unusual time signatures. Hetfield explained: "Songwriting-wise, [the album] was just us really showing off and trying to show what we could do. 'We've jammed six riffs into one song? Let's make it eight. Let's go crazy with it.'"

Critic Simon Reynolds noted the riff changes and experimentation with timing on the album's intricately constructed songs: "The tempo shifts, gear changes, lapses, decelerations and abrupt halts". BBC Music's Eamonn Stack wrote that ...And Justice for All sounds different from the band's previous albums, with longer songs, sparser arrangements, and harsher vocals by Hetfield. According to journalist Martin Popoff, the album is less melodic than its predecessors because of its frequent tempo changes, unusual song structures and layered guitars. He argued that the album is more of a progressive metal record because of its intricately performed music and bleak sound. Music writer Joel McIver called the album's music aggressive enough for Metallica to maintain its place with bands "at the mellower end of extreme metal". According to writer Christopher Knowles, Metallica took "the thrash concept to its logical conclusion" on the album. Loudwire stated that the album represents a release in the technical thrash metal subgenre.

=== Lyrics ===
"...And Justice for All"
The title track is based on an aggressive riff and a drum pattern by Ulrich.

"One"
"One" was inspired by the novel Johnny Got His Gun and the movie of the same name. It begins with overdubbed guitars, which eventually convert to powerful riffing.

The album title was revealed in April 1988: ...And Justice for All, after the final words of the Pledge of Allegiance. The lyrics address political and legal injustice as seen through the prism of war (including nuclear war) and censored speech. The majority of the songs raise issues that differ from the violent retaliation of the previous releases. Tom King writes that for the first time the lyrics dealt with political and environmental issues. He named contemporaries Nuclear Assault as the only other band who applied ecological lyrics to thrash metal songs rather than singing about Satan and Egyptian plagues. McIver noted that Hetfield, the band's main lyricist, wrote about topics that he had not addressed before, such as his revolt against the establishment. Ulrich described the songwriting process as their "CNN years", with him and Hetfield watching the channel in search for song subjects—"I'd read about the blacklisting thing, we'd get a title, 'The Shortest Straw,' and a song would come out of that."

Concerns about the state of the environment ("Blackened"), corruption ("...And Justice for All"), and blacklisting and discrimination ("The Shortest Straw") are emphasized with traditional existential themes. Issues such as freedom of speech and civil liberties ("Eye of the Beholder") are presented from a grim and pessimistic point of view. "One" was unofficially nicknamed an "antiwar anthem" for its lyrics, which portray the suffering of a wounded soldier. "Dyers Eve" is a lyrical rant from Hetfield to his parents. Burton received co-writing credit on "To Live Is to Die" as the bass line is a medley of unused recordings Burton had performed before his death. Because the track does not use the original recordings, the composition is credited as written by Burton and played by Newsted. The spoken word section of the song was erroneously attributed in its entirety to Burton in the liner notes. The first line was actually from the film Excalibur—"When a man lies, he murders some part of the world," while the second line comes from Lord Foul's Bane, a fantasy novel by American writer Stephen R. Donaldson—"These are the pale deaths which men miscall their lives." The second half of the speech, "All this I cannot bear to witness any longer. Cannot the kingdom of salvation take me home?", was written by Burton.

== Release and artwork ==
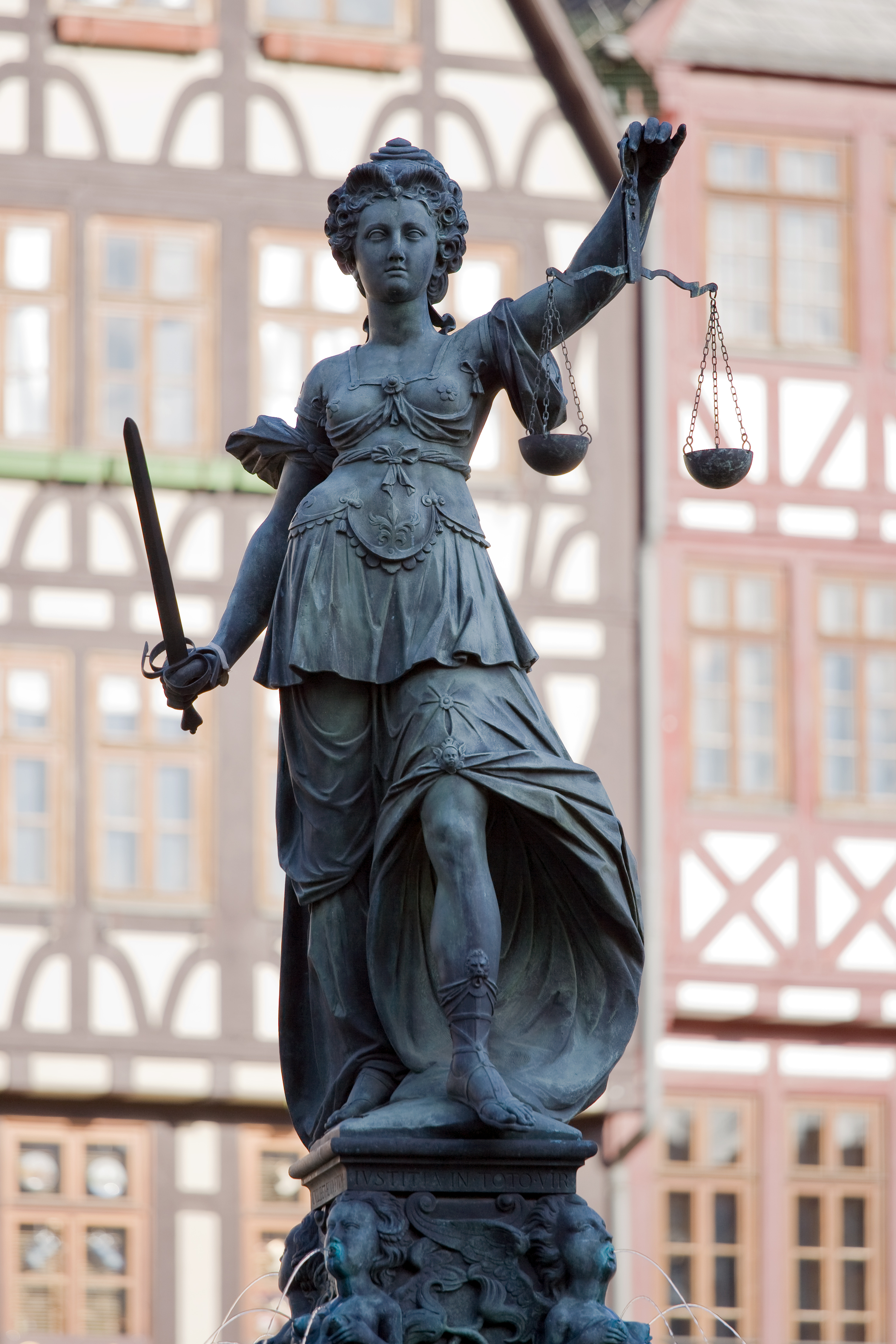
The cover artwork depicts Lady Justice. It was designed by Stephen Gorman, who used the pictured sculpture in Frankfurt am Main, Germany, as a model.

...And Justice for All was released on September 7, 1988, by Elektra Records in the US and Vertigo Records in the UK. The album was supported by three singles. "Harvester of Sorrow" was released as the first single in Europe only on August 28, 1988, with the cover songs "Breadfan" and "The Prince" as the B-sides. It reached number 20 on the UK singles chart. "Eye of the Beholder" was released as the second single in the US only on October 30, with "Breadfan" as the B-side. The title track was released in edited form as a promotional single in 1988, but failed to chart.

"One" appeared as the third single on January 10, 1989. The US single had "The Prince" as the B-side, while the UK single replaced that with a live version of "Seek & Destroy" (1983), recorded in Dallas, Texas, on February 9, 1989. After years of refusing to release music videos, Metallica released its first for "One". The video features the band performing the song live in a hangar in Long Beach, California, scenes directed by Bill Pope, interspersed with footage from Dalton Trumbo's 1971 film Johnny Got His Gun. Metallica acquired the rights to the film, after which Michael Salomon edited the footage together. The video was controversial among fans, who had valued the band's apparent opposition to MTV and other forms of mainstream music. Slant Magazine ranked it number 48 on their list of the "100 Greatest Music Videos", saying that Metallica "evoke a revolution of the soul far more devastating than that presented in the original text".

The album's artwork depicts a cracked statue of a blindfolded Lady Justice, bound by ropes with her breasts exposed and her scales overflowing with dollar bills, with the title in graffiti style. It was created by Stephen Gorman, based on a concept developed by Hetfield and Ulrich. Gorman used the Fountain of Justice in Frankfurt am Main, Germany, as a model. The image became representative of the album's themes. Ulrich stated: "It's about our court system in the US where it seems like no one is even concerned with finding out the truth any more. It's becoming more and more like the one lawyer versus another-type situation, where the best lawyer can alter justice in any way he wants."

== Critical reception ==
Professional ratings
Review scores
Source	Rating
AllMusic	4.5/5 stars
Chicago Tribune	2.5/4 stars
The Encyclopedia of Popular Music	3/5 stars
Metal Forces	10/10
Q	4/5 stars
Rock Hard	9.5/10
Rolling Stone	4/5 stars
The Rolling Stone Album Guide	4.5/5 stars
The Village Voice	C+

...And Justice for All was acclaimed by music critics. In a contemporary review for Rolling Stone, Michael Azerrad said that Metallica's compositions are impressive and called the album's music "a marvel of precisely channeled aggression". Spin magazine's Sharon Liveten called it a "gem of a double record" and found the music both edgy and technically proficient. Tom Moon praised the album in The Philadelphia Inquirer, writing that Metallica has "redefined its genre, creating music that is as consistently tense and arresting as the topics the sometimes convoluted lyrics address". Simon Reynolds, writing in Melody Maker, said that "other bands would give their eye teeth" for the songs' riffs and found the album's densely complicated style of metal to be distinct from the monotonous sound of contemporary rock music: "Everything depends on utter punctuality and supreme surgical finesse. It's probably the most incisive music I've ever heard, in the literal sense of the word."

Neil Perry of Sounds magazine said the album was Metallica at "their most confident", while The Morning Call's Len Righi called the album "a mind-boggling musical display that runs the gamut from thrashing power chords to classical melodies, plus salient lyrics to balance the scales." Billboard magazine predicted the album would satisfy fans and lack radio appeal with its "grim themes, curveball writing style, and general ferocity of playing". Borivoj Krgin of Metal Forces said that it was the most ideal album he has heard because of typically exceptional production and musicianship that is more impressive than that of Master of Puppets. In a less enthusiastic review for The Village Voice, Robert Christgau believed that the band's compositions lack song form and that the album "goes on longer" than Master of Puppets.

=== Retrospective reviews ===
The album's reception has remained positive in the decades following its release, with many describing it as one of Metallica's best. (Note: Attributed to multiple references:) In a retrospective review, Greg Kot of the Chicago Tribune and said that ...And Justice for All was both the band's "most ambitious" and ultimately "flattest-sounding" album. AllMusic's Steve Huey noted that Metallica followed the blueprint of the previous two albums, with more sophisticated songs and "apocalyptic" lyrics that envisioned a society in decay. Consequence's Robert Ham said that, despite its inaudible bass guitar, ...And Justice for All remains a "triumph", praising its complexity and the band members' performances. Pitchfork's Sean T. Collins argued ...And Justice For All is Metallica's best album, praising the songwriting as Hetfield and Ulrich's "most complex and vicious". Author Benoît Clerc called the album a "monument of metal music", praising its "long, complex songs" and said it marked the end of an era for Metallica.

Critics and fans primarily criticize the album's production and inaudible bass guitar. (Note: Attributed to multiple references:) Ultimate Classic Rock wrote: "Just about any other metal band would be proud to call this album their signature work. But the thin production remains a big sticking point." In a more mixed assessment, music journalist Mick Wall was critical of the progressive elements and believed that, apart from "One" and "Dyers Eve", most of the album sounded clumsy. Colin Larkin, writing in The Encyclopedia of Popular Music (2006), noted that, apart from the praiseworthy "One", the album diminished the band's creativity by concentrating the songs with too many riffs. Conversely, Ulrich said the album's reception has improved over time and is well-liked among their contemporaries.

== Commercial performance ==
Although Metallica's music was considered unappealing for mainstream radio, ...And Justice for All was highly successful in the US. It became Metallica's best-selling album upon release, peaking at number six on the Billboard 200, where it charted for 83 weeks. More than 9,700,000 copies have been sold in the United States since 1991, when Nielsen SoundScan began tracking sales. It was certified platinum nine weeks after it was released in stores, and 1.7 million copies were sold in the US by the end of 1988. Since its release, the album has scanned more than 8 million copies in the US and, according to MTV's Chris Harris, "helped cement [Metallica's] status as a rock and roll force to be reckoned with". Classic Rock explained that with this album, Metallica received substantial media exposure, becoming a multi-platinum act by 1990. The group broke through on radio in early 1989 with "One", which was released as the third single from the record. According to Billboard, the accompanying Damaged Justice tour evolved the band into arena headliners, while significant airplay was garnered by "One" and by the group's first music video.

...And Justice for All achieved similar chart success outside the United States. It topped the charts in Finland, peaked within the top five on the charts in Germany, Sweden, and the United Kingdom, and remained on the UK chart for six weeks. The album managed to peak in the top ten on the Norwegian and Swiss album charts, as well as in Spain. It was less successful in Mexico and France, where it peaked at number 92 on the former chart, number 130 on the latter. ...And Justice for All received a three times platinum certification from Music Canada for shipping 300,000 copies, a platinum certification from IFPI Finland for having a shipment of little over 50,000 copies, and was certified gold by the Bundesverband Musikindustrie (BVMI) for shipments of 250,000 copies. It was awarded gold by the British Phonographic Industry in 2013 for shipping 100,000 copies in the UK. ...And Justice for All was surpassed commercially by the band's following album, Metallica (1991).

== Accolades ==
=== Rankings ===
In The Village Voice's annual Pazz & Jop critics poll, it was voted the 39th best album of 1988, having received 117 points within 12 top-ten votes. The album was ranked at number nine on IGN's "Top 25 Metal Albums". Guitar World lists all of its tracks on "The 100 Greatest Metallica Songs of All Time". Kerrang! listed the album at number 42 among the "100 Greatest Heavy Metal Albums of All Time". Martin Popoff ranks it at number 19 in his book The Top 500 Heavy Metal Albums of All Time, the fourth highest ranked Metallica album on the list. It is featured in Robert Dimery's 1001 Albums You Must Hear Before You Die. In 2015, Ultimate Classic Rock included the album in its list of the top 100 albums of the 1980s. Two years later, it was ranked 21st on Rolling Stone's list of "100 Greatest Metal Albums of All Time".

=== Grammy controversy ===
The 31st Annual Grammy Awards were held on February 22, 1989, at the Shrine Auditorium in Los Angeles. ...And Justice for All was nominated for the inaugural Grammy Award for Best Hard Rock/Metal Performance. The band performed a five-minute version of "One" at the ceremony, marking the first time a heavy metal group had performed at the Grammy Awards. Hammett recalled the band being "very nervous" playing for the Academy: "We were like diplomats or representatives for this genre of music." Metallica was widely expected to win the award, but controversially lost to Jethro Tull's Crest of a Knave.

Jethro Tull's win was controversial, and the National Academy of Recording Arts and Sciences was widely criticized for the choice. Metallica added a sticker to subsequent releases of ...And Justice for All, reading: "Grammy Award LOSERS". In 2009, Ulrich said: "I'd be lying if I didn't tell you I was disappointed. Human nature is that you'd rather win than lose, but Jethro Tull walking away with it makes a huge mockery of the intentions of the event." In 2007, Entertainment Weekly named Jethro Tull's win one of the 10 biggest upsets in Grammy history. At the following year's ceremony, the Academy separated Best Hard Rock/Metal Performance into two distinct categories: Best Hard Rock Performance and Best Metal Performance. Metallica won the latter award for "One".

== Live performances ==
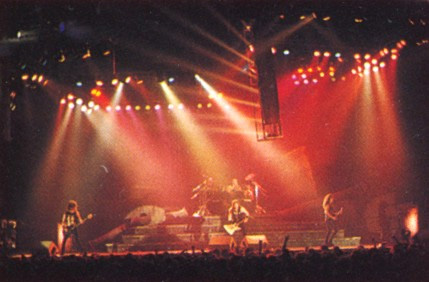
Metallica onstage during the Damaged Justice Tour, 1989

Metallica supported ...And Justice for All on the Damaged Justice tour, a large-scale arena tour across North America, Europe, and Oceania. The tour featured multiple sell-out dates. The stage dressing was also more elaborate than previous tours, featuring a large replica of Lady Justice adorning the ...And Justice for All album cover. The tour turned Metallica into superstars.

Guitarist Kirk Hammett noted that the length of the songs was problematic for fans and for the band: "Touring behind it, we realized that the general consensus was that songs were too fucking long [...] I can remember getting offstage one night after playing 'Justice' and one of us saying, 'Fuck, that's the last time we ever play that fucking song!'" Ulrich later recalled the band "started having a few conversations that maybe we had taken the progressive side of Metallica as far as it could go and we were all yearning for stuff that was little bit simpler and maybe a little more physical". Nevertheless, "One" quickly became a permanent fixture in the band's setlist. When performed live, the opening war sound is extended from seventeen seconds to approximately two minutes. At the song's conclusion, the stage turns pitch-black and fire erupts from around the stage. The live performance is characterized as a "musical and visual highlight" by Rolling Stone journalist Denise Sheppard. After the tour, the band began writing simpler songs, ultimately leading to the material found on Metallica (1991).

Metallica played the title track in the opening show of the Sick of the Studio '07 tour, for the first time since October 1989, and made it a set-fixture for the remainder of that tour. A statue of Lady Justice is commonly placed on the scene, to be torn down as the song approaches its conclusion. In 2009, "The Shortest Straw" returned to the setlist during the World Magnetic Tour after a 12-year absence, and has been sporadically performed since. "Eye of the Beholder" has not been played live since 1989; one such performance appears on Metallica's live extended play Six Feet Down Under. "Dyers Eve" debuted live in 2004, sixteen years after it was recorded, during the Madly in Anger with the World Tour at The Forum in Inglewood, California. "To Live Is to Die" premiered at the band's 30th-anniversary concert in 2011 at The Fillmore in San Francisco. "The Frayed Ends of Sanity", the last song on the album to be performed live, debuted live in Helsinki on the Metallica By Request tour in 2014.

== 2018 box set ==
Professional ratings
30th Anniversary Edition
Aggregate scores
Source	Rating
Metacritic	93/100
Review scores
Source	Rating
Classic Rock	4/5 stars
Mojo	4/5 stars
Pitchfork	9.3/10
Rolling Stone	4.5/5 stars
Uncut	4/5 stars

In 2018, ...And Justice for All was remastered and reissued in a limited edition deluxe box set with an expanded track listing and bonus content. The deluxe edition set includes the original album on vinyl and CD, three LPs with a remixed and remastered version of the concerts performed at the Seattle Coliseum, Seattle, Washington, on August 29 and 30, 1989 (originally included in the box set Live Shit: Binge & Purge), eleven CDs of live tracks, demo recordings, B-sides, rough mixes, and radio edits recorded from 1986 to 1989, and four DVDs of unreleased footage of the band.

Hetfield opted not to remix the album, saying: "These records are a product of a certain time in life; they're snapshots of history and they're part of our story ...And Justice for All could use a little more low end and St. Anger could use a little less tin snare drum, but those things are what make those records part of our history." Pitchfork's Sean T. Collins defended Hetfield, writing: "By refusing to soften the blow and reshape the record's sonic signature into something more ear-pleasing, this reissue correctly implies that the music stands the test of time as well as the words. It does justice to every nightmare note."

The box set received acclaim. Rolling Stone's Kory Grow described the remaster as "crisp and forceful", saying that its power lies in "the way the drums and rhythm guitar punches you in the face". Grow cited the "riff tapes" and the writing sessions as some of the box set's highlights. He also noted how the "rough mixes", which contained alternate guitar solos and vocal harmonies, were the closest fans would get to a proper "bass mix" of the album. Classic Rock magazine's Rich Davenport believed that the remasters made the bass "more discernible", adding a "warmth and fullness which enhances the moments" of the nine songs. The reissue reached number 37 and 42 on Billboard's Top Album Sales and Top Rock Albums charts, respectively.

== Track listing ==
All lyrics written by James Hetfield, except for the spoken word section of "To Live Is to Die", posthumously attributed to Cliff Burton as it was adapted from four lines Burton authored.

Side one
No.	Title	Music	Length
1.	"Blackened"	Hetfield; Lars Ulrich; Jason Newsted	6:42
2.	"...And Justice for All"	Hetfield; Ulrich; Kirk Hammett	9:46

Side two
No.	Title	Music	Length
3.	"Eye of the Beholder"	Hetfield; Ulrich; Hammett	6:25
4.	"One"	Hetfield; Ulrich	7:26

Side three
No.	Title	Music	Length
5.	"The Shortest Straw"	Hetfield; Ulrich	6:35
6.	"Harvester of Sorrow"	Hetfield; Ulrich	5:45
7.	"The Frayed Ends of Sanity"	Hetfield; Ulrich; Hammett	7:43

Side four
No.	Title	Music	Length
8.	"To Live Is to Die"	Hetfield; Ulrich; Burton	9:49
9.	"Dyers Eve"	Hetfield; Ulrich; Hammett	5:14
Total length:			65:25

The bonus tracks on the digital re-release were recorded live at the Seattle Coliseum, Seattle, Washington on August 29 and 30, 1989, and later appeared on the live album Live Shit: Binge & Purge (1993).

== Personnel ==
Credits adapted from the album's liner notes,

Metallica

- James Hetfield – vocals, rhythm guitar, acoustic guitar, harmony guitar, second guitar solo on "To Live Is to Die", production
- Lars Ulrich – drums, production
- Kirk Hammett – lead guitar
- Jason Newsted – bass guitar

Production

- Flemming Rasmussen – production, engineering
- Toby "Rage" Wright – engineering assistance, additional engineering
- Mike Clink – drum engineering on "The Shortest Straw" and "Harvester of Sorrow"
- Steve Thompson – mixing
- Michael Barbiero – mixing
- George Cowan – mixing assistance
- Bob Ludwig – mastering
- George Marino – 1995 remastering
- Reuben Cohen – 2018 remastering
- Chris Bellman – 2018 vinyl lacquering

Artwork

- James Hetfield – cover concept
- Lars Ulrich – cover concept
- Stephen Gorman – cover illustration
- Ross "Tobacco Road" Halfin – photography
- Pushead – hammer illustration
- Reiner Design Consultants, Inc. – design, layout

== Charts ==
=== Weekly charts ===
Weekly chart performance for ...And Justice for All
Chart (1988–2021)	Peak position
Australian Albums (ARIA)	16
Austrian Albums (Ö3 Austria)	12
Belgian Albums (Ultratop Flanders)	25
Belgian Albums (Ultratop Wallonia)	40
Canadian Albums (RPM)	13
Dutch Albums (Album Top 100)	9
Finnish Albums (Suomen virallinen lista)	1
French Albums (SNEP)	130
German Albums (Offizielle Top 100)	3
Hungarian Albums (MAHASZ)	22
Irish Albums (IRMA)	48
Italian Albums (FIMI)	56
Japanese Albums (Oricon)	119
Mexican Albums (Top 100 Mexico)	92
New Zealand Albums (RMNZ)	36
Norwegian Albums (VG-lista)	8
Polish Albums (ZPAV)	7
Portuguese Albums (AFP)	9
Spanish Albums (PROMUSICAE)	8
Swedish Albums (Sverigetopplistan)	5
Swiss Albums (Schweizer Hitparade)	7
UK Albums (OCC)	4
UK Rock & Metal Albums (OCC)	1
US Billboard 200	6

=== Year-end charts ===
1994 year-end chart performance for ...And Justice for All
Chart (1994)	Position
Australian Albums (ARIA)	77

2002 year-end chart performance for ...And Justice for All
Chart (2002)	Position
Canadian Metal Albums (Nielsen SoundScan)	76

2020 year-end chart performance for ...And Justice for All
Chart (2020)	Position
Polish Albums (ZPAV)	65

2021 year-end chart performance for ...And Justice for All
Chart (2021)	Position
Polish Albums (ZPAV)	54

== Certifications ==
Certifications and sales for ...And Justice for All
Region	Certification	Certified units/sales
Argentina (CAPIF)	Platinum	60,000^{^}
Australia (ARIA)	3× Platinum	210,000^{‡}
Canada (Music Canada)	3× Platinum	300,000^{^}
Denmark (IFPI Danmark)	Gold	10,000^{‡}
Finland (Musiikkituottajat)	Platinum	51,051
Germany (BVMI)	2× Platinum	1,000,000^{‡}
Italy (FIMI)	Gold	25,000^{‡}
New Zealand (RMNZ)	Gold	7,500^{^}
Norway (IFPI Norway)	Gold	25,000^{*}
Poland (ZPAV)	Platinum	20,000^{‡}
Switzerland (IFPI Switzerland)	Platinum	50,000^{^}
United Kingdom (BPI)	Platinum	300,000^{‡}
United States (RIAA)	8× Platinum	9,700,000
^{*} Sales figures based on certification alone.^{^} Shipments figures based on certification alone.^{‡} Sales+streaming figures based on certification alone.
