= Eye of the Beholder (song) =

Single by Metallica

from the album ...And Justice for All
- B-side: "Breadfan"
- Released: October 30, 1988
- Recorded: January 28 – May 1, 1988
- Studio: One on One (Los Angeles)
- Genre: Progressive metal
- Length: 6:25 (album version); 5:58 (radio edit)
- Label: Elektra
- Composers: James Hetfield; Lars Ulrich; Kirk Hammett
- Lyricist: James Hetfield
- Producers: James Hetfield; Flemming Rasmussen; Lars Ulrich

Metallica singles chronology
| "...And Justice for All" (1988) | "Eye of the Beholder" (1988) | "One" (1989) |

"Eye of the Beholder" is a song by the American heavy metal band Metallica. It was released in October 30, 1988, as the second single from their fourth studio album, ...And Justice for All, where it also features as track 3. The song has not been performed live in its entirety since 1989, and drummer Lars Ulrich has stated that it is his least favourite Metallica song, in part due to the alternating time signatures. "It sounds like you put a square peg in a round hole".

== Background ==
"Eye of the Beholder" features political lyrics about the nature of civil liberties. The chorus is in 12/8 time while the rest of the track stays in basic 4/4.

The song has not been performed live in its entirety since 1989, however it did feature as part of a medley of songs from …And Justice for All often played by the band in concert during the 1990s. One of these medleys was featured on the band's 1993 live album Live Shit: Binge & Purge. Due to Ulrich's disdain for the song, it is unlikely to be played in full again.

== Track listing ==
US 7-inch single
| No. | Title | Writer(s) | Length |
|---|---|---|---|
| 1. | "Eye of the Beholder" | James Hetfield; Lars Ulrich; Kirk Hammett | 6:25 |
| 2. | "Breadfan" | Tony Bourge; Burke Shelley; Ray Phillips | 5:44 |

== Cover versions ==
In Flames recorded a cover of "Eye of the Beholder" for Metal Militia: A Tribute to Metallica, a tribute album recorded by various artists. This version of the song also appears on the remastered edition of In Flames' first EP, Subterranean. A cover of the song by Life After Death appears on Metallic Attack: The Ultimate Tribute.

== Personnel ==
Credits adapted from ...And Justice for All's liner notes.

Metallica

- James Hetfield – vocals, rhythm guitar
- Kirk Hammett – lead guitar
- Jason Newsted – bass
- Lars Ulrich – drums

Production

- James Hetfield – production
- Lars Ulrich – production
- Flemming Rasmussen – production, engineering
- Toby "Rage" Wright – assistant and additional engineering
- Steve Thompson, Michael Barbiero – mixing
- George Cowan – assistant mixing engineer
- Bob Ludwig – mastering
- George Marino – 1995 remastering
- Reuben Cohen – 2018 remastering

Artwork

- James Hetfield, Lars Ulrich – cover concept
- Stephen Gorman – cover illustration
- Ross "Tobacco Road" Halfin – photography
- Pushead – hammer illustration
- Reiner Design Consultants, Inc. – design, layout
