= Wherever I May Roam =

Single by Metallica

from the album Metallica
- B-side: "Fade to Black" (live)
- Released: October 19, 1992
- Recorded: April 1991
- Studio: One on One (Los Angeles)
- Genre: Heavy metal
- Length: 6:44
- Label: Elektra
- Composers: James Hetfield; Lars Ulrich
- Lyricist: James Hetfield
- Producers: Bob Rock; James Hetfield; Lars Ulrich

Metallica singles chronology
"Nothing Else Matters" (1992)	"Wherever I May Roam" (1992)	"Sad but True" (1993)

Music video
- "Wherever I May Roam" on YouTube

"Wherever I May Roam" is a song by American heavy metal band Metallica. It was released in October 1992 as the fourth single from their eponymous fifth album, Metallica (1991). It reached number 82 on the US Billboard Hot 100 peaked at number 25 on the Billboard Album Rock Tracks chart and peaked at number two in Denmark, Finland and Norway.

== Music ==
All stringed instruments featured in this song, both guitars and basses, use standard tuning. The intro of the song is notable for its unusual instrumentation for the band: Asian instruments such as a gong and sitar, along with an overdubbed Warwick twelve-string bass. This 12-string bass was only used for effect during the intro to emphasize several accented notes and then a standard tuned 4-string bass was used as the main bass instrument throughout the remainder of the recording.

The song is performed frequently during the band's live concerts, and was performed with the San Francisco Symphony Orchestra (conducted by Michael Kamen) on the live S&M and its companion DVD, as well as the 2019 S&M2. When performed live, the band has always relied on their original sitar recording for the intro (the band enters on the first accented note to dramatic effect); however, for the S&M concerts guitarist Kirk Hammett utilized a Danelectro electric sitar for the intro before switching to his ESP electric guitar.

The music video featured clips from Metallica behind the scenes and in concert, during their Wherever We May Roam Tour. The video version of the song is edited omitting the first bridge and third chorus and the last line in the second chorus "Where I lay my head is home" edited to end off as the third chorus does on the studio version with the words "That's where" leading into Hammett's guitar solo of the second bridge.

== Demo ==
The song's demo was recorded in Lars Ulrich's home musical studio "Dungeon" on August 13, 1990.

== Track listings ==
US single

1. "Wherever I May Roam" – 6:42
2. "Fade to Black" (live) – 7:43

International single

1. "Wherever I May Roam" – 6:43
2. "Fade to Black" (live) – 7:43
3. "Wherever I May Roam" (demo) – 5:35

International digipak single

1. "Wherever I May Roam" – 6:45
2. "Last Caress" (live)/"Am I Evil?" (live)/"Battery" (live) – 11:59

Japanese EP

1. "Wherever I May Roam" – 6:44
2. "Fade to Black" (live) – 7:44
3. "Last Caress" (live)/"Am I Evil?" (live)/"Battery" (live) – 11:59

== Personnel ==
- James Hetfield – rhythm guitar, vocals
- Kirk Hammett – lead guitar
- Jason Newsted – bass
- Lars Ulrich – drums, percussion

== Music video ==
The music video directed by Wayne Isham and filmed in January 1992 in San Diego while on tour throughout the Northeast in March 1992. It premiered on 21 May 1992.

== Charts ==
=== Weekly charts ===
Chart (1992–1993)	Peak position
Australia (ARIA)	14
Belgium (Ultratop 50 Flanders)	35
Canada Retail Singles (The Record)	20
Denmark (IFPI)	2
Europe (Eurochart Hot 100)	19
Finland (Suomen virallinen lista)	2
France (SNEP)	28
Germany (GfK)	30
Ireland (IRMA)	15
Netherlands (Dutch Top 40)	22
Netherlands (Single Top 100)	22
New Zealand (Recorded Music NZ)	8
Norway (VG-lista)	2
Sweden (Sverigetopplistan)	28
UK Singles (Official Charts)	25
US Billboard Hot 100	82
US Mainstream Rock (Billboard)	25
US Cash Box Top 100	62

Chart (2021)	Peak position
Top Triller US (Billboard)	7

Chart (2026)	Peak position
Greece International (IFPI)	43

=== Year-end charts ===
Chart (1993)	Position
Australia (ARIA)	76

== Certifications ==
Region	Certification	Certified units/sales
Australia (ARIA)	2× Platinum	140,000^{‡}
New Zealand (RMNZ)	Gold	15,000^{‡}
United Kingdom (BPI)	Silver	200,000^{‡}
United States (RIAA)	Platinum	1,000,000^{‡}
^{‡} Sales+streaming figures based on certification alone.
