= One (Metallica song) =

1989 single by Metallica

Single by Metallica

from the album ...And Justice for All
- B-side: "The Prince" (7")
- Released: January 10, 1989
- Recorded: 1988
- Studio: One on One (Los Angeles)
- Genre: Thrash metal; progressive metal
- Length: 7:27 (album version); 5:02 (radio edit)
- Label: Elektra
- Composers: James Hetfield; Lars Ulrich
- Lyricist: James Hetfield
- Producers: Flemming Rasmussen; James Hetfield; Lars Ulrich

Metallica singles chronology
"Eye of the Beholder" (1988)	"One" (1989)	"Enter Sandman" (1991)

Music video
- "One" on YouTube

Audio sample
- "One": file; help

Alternative cover
- "One" (live) cover

"One" is a song by American heavy metal band Metallica, released as the third and final single from the band's fourth studio album, ...And Justice for All (1988). Written by band members James Hetfield and Lars Ulrich, the song portrays a World War I soldier who is severely wounded by a land mine. Blind, deaf, and unable to speak or move, he begs God to take his life. In the music video, attempting to communicate with the hospital staff he jolts in his bed, spelling SOS in Morse code. Production of the song was done by the band alongside Flemming Rasmussen. It peaked at No. 35 on the Billboard Hot 100 and was a number one hit in Finland.

A video for the song was introduced in January 1989 on MTV. Shot in black and white by director Michael Salomon, the video's story is intercut with scenes taken from the 1971 anti-war film Johnny Got His Gun. Due to routinely being required to pay royalty fees to continue showing the music video, Metallica bought the rights to the film. The video was ranked at number one on MTV soon after its introduction.

Metallica performed "One" for the 31st Annual Grammy Awards show broadcast from Los Angeles in 1989. The next year, the song won a Grammy Award for Best Metal Performance, the first ever to win in that category. The band also performed the song alongside pianist Lang Lang at the 56th Annual Grammy Awards in 2014. The song is one of the band's most popular pieces and has remained a staple at live shows since the release of the album, and is the most performed song from ...And Justice for All. In March 2023, Rolling Stone ranked "One" at number 11 on their "100 Greatest Heavy Metal Songs of All Time" list.

The song's breakdown is considered by some journalists to be the first breakdown in metal to use start-stop double-kick drumming. In 2022, the staff of Revolver emphasized its importance, stating that it is "still being played today by metalcore bands and hardcore bands."

== Recording and composition ==
"One" was written in November 1987 by Metallica's principal composers Hetfield and Ulrich. The song was released in 1988 as the third and final single of the album. For the first 20 seconds of the song there are a series of sound effects with a battle theme, an artillery barrage and helicopter are heard and continues slightly over a clean tone guitar intro by Hetfield before Kirk Hammett comes in over the top with a clean-toned solo. Ulrich's drums come in and continue until each chorus, when the guitars become heavy and distorted before returning to clean. There is a second solo by Hammett halfway through the song, before lyrics cut out and the song gradually gets heavier and distorted until the "machine gun" guitar build up (played alongside double bass drums) before the next, often highly praised, guitar solo by Hammett, and a final dual solo by Hammett and Hetfield. The song begins in 4/4 time, and later 3/4 as well as 2/4.

In 1991, Hetfield told Guitar World that he wrote the song's opening Bm-G chord change based on an idea prompted by the Venom song "Buried Alive" from their second studio album, Black Metal.

I had been fiddling around with that B-G modulation for a long time. The idea for the opening came from a Venom song called "Buried Alive". The kick drum machine-gun part near the end wasn't written with the war lyrics in mind, it just came out that way. We started that album with Mike Clink as producer. He didn't work out so well, so we got Flemming to come over and save our asses.

The song starts off in a soft melodic setting, but it develops through multiple sections into heavier and faster speed metal sounds, leading up to a tapping solo by Hammett, and a dual guitar section by Hammett and James Hetfield.

== Concept ==
The song is based on the idea of a soldier losing all of his limbs and jaw and being unable to hear, speak, or see, set to a World War I backdrop. In an interview in New Zealand in 1989, Ulrich describes the 1971 film Johnny Got His Gun (based on the 1939 book Johnny Got His Gun by Dalton Trumbo, who also directed the 1971 film) as having a similar theme, and this was the reason it was incorporated into the video.

== Lyrics ==
The song is written in 4 stanzas of 4 verses each, with a refrain of 2 verses which appears once after the first 2 stanzas and twice in an extended refrain after the last 2 stanzas. The double repetition of the final refrain is amplified in meaning by 2 isolated verses appearing before the last repetition of the refrain. The refrain repetition alternates the use of the closing verses of "Oh please, God, wake me" and "Oh please, God, help me". Following the last refrain, the lyrics transition to 2 closing stanzas of 7 verses each which amplify the loss and despair being expressed by the singer.

The Times of India described the meaning of the lyrics as: "a deeply moving and impactful anti-war anthem... It narrates the tragic story of a World War I soldier who, following a catastrophic landmine explosion, is left grievously injured—missing his arms, legs, and jaw, and rendered blind, mute, and immobile. Trapped within his own body, he silently implores God to end his misery." In the completion of the song as the lyrics end, the song moves into a "machine gun" guitar riff played with double bass drums in the background by Hammett and Hetfield.

== Music video ==
"One" was the first Metallica song for which a music video was created. The music video, directed by Bill Pope and Michael Salomon, debuted on MTV on January 20, 1989. The video, shot in Long Beach, California on December 7, 1988, is almost entirely in black and white, and features the band performing the song in a warehouse. It features dialogue and several scenes from the 1971 film adaptation of Johnny Got His Gun. Timothy Bottoms can be seen starring as Joe Bonham, the main character in the novel (written by Dalton Trumbo and published in September 1939, and the basis for the 1971 film).

Three versions of the "One" music video were made; the first (the longest, album version) contained scenes of both the band and scenes from the movie. The second was simply a shortened version of the first, and the third, often known as the "jammin' version", lacked scenes from the movie (the song and video fade at the last bridge in this version).

Like many other music videos from Metallica, "One" puts great emphasis on the performances of the band members as musicians, with many shots of Hetfield, Jason Newsted and Hammett's hands picking and fretting. The video features the band members in typical early Metallica fashion: playing, or perhaps rehearsing, in a large area such as a warehouse, in tight formation around Lars Ulrich's drum kit, and dressed in casual street clothes and with long, untamed hair.

In the music video, both Hetfield and Hammett play ESP guitars; Newsted is on a 5-string Wal bass. Newsted plays bass with his fingers at the start of the song, and later switches to a pick.

Two of the three versions of the "One" music video appear on 2 of One, a VHS videocassette released on June 6, 1989; the same two versions would again be featured on the band's 2006 music video compilation DVD.

The music video was ranked at number 38 on Rock on the Net: MTV: 100 Greatest Music Videos and number one on Fuse's No. 1 Countdown: Rock and Roll Hall of Fame Special Edition.

== Live performance ==
"One" is a fixture of the band's live performances. When played live, the song is usually played with guitars tuned down by one semitone (E-flat tuning would remain a permanent fixture of their live work since 1995) and is preceded by pyrotechnics and the same sounds of war such as machine guns, and bombs exploding as heard on the recorded version.

The song was also featured on S&M and S&M2, Metallica's albums of live performances in collaboration with the San Francisco Symphony Orchestra, conducted by Michael Kamen, and Michael Tilson Thomas respectively. Another notable performance was at the Grammy Awards 2014, when pianist Lang Lang accompanied the band on an acoustic grand piano.

== Track listing ==
=== "One" single ===
US 7" single
No.	Title	Writer(s)	Length
1.	"One"	James Hetfield; Lars Ulrich	7:24
2.	"The Prince" (Diamond Head cover)	Sean Harris; Brian Tatler	4:27

CD single and international 12" single
No.	Title	Writer(s)	Length
1.	"One"	Hetfield; Ulrich	7:24
2.	"For Whom the Bell Tolls" (live)	Hetfield; Ulrich; Cliff Burton	4:48
3.	"Welcome Home (Sanitarium)" (live)	Hetfield; Ulrich; Kirk Hammett	6:06

International 7" single and international 10" picture disc
No.	Title	Writer(s)	Length
1.	"One"	Hetfield; Ulrich	7:24
2.	"Seek & Destroy" (live)	Hetfield; Ulrich	8:42

12" Gatefold
No.	Title	Writer(s)	Length
1.	"One" (demo version)	Hetfield; Ulrich	7:03
2.	"For Whom the Bell Tolls" (live)	Hetfield; Ulrich; Burton	4:48
3.	"Creeping Death" (live)	Hetfield; Ulrich; Burton; Hammett	8:00

Japanese EP
No.	Title	Writer(s)	Length
1.	"One"	Hetfield; Ulrich	7:24
2.	"Breadfan" (Budgie cover)	Tony Bourge; Ray Phillips; Burke Shelley	5:43
3.	"For Whom the Bell Tolls" (live)	Hetfield; Ulrich; Burton	4:48
4.	"Welcome Home (Sanitarium)" (live)	Hetfield; Ulrich; Hammett	6:06
5.	"One" (demo version)	Hetfield; Ulrich	7:04

=== "One" (live) single ===
CD single and 12" picture disc
No.	Title	Writer(s)	Length
1.	"One"	Hetfield; Ulrich	7:27
2.	"One" (demo)	Hetfield; Ulrich	7:03
3.	"One" (live)	Hetfield; Ulrich	9:38

Cardsleeve
No.	Title	Writer(s)	Length
1.	"One" (edit)	Hetfield; Ulrich	4:59
2.	"One" (live)	Hetfield; Ulrich	9:38

Digipak
No.	Title	Writer(s)	Length
1.	"One" (live)	Hetfield; Ulrich	9:49
2.	"Whiplash" (live)	Hetfield; Ulrich	4:46
3.	"For Whom the Bell Tolls" (live)	Hetfield; Ulrich; Burton	5:50
4.	"Last Caress" (live)	Glenn Danzig	2:25

== Personnel ==
Personnel adapted from ...And Justice For All liner notes

Metallica

- James Hetfield – vocals, rhythm guitar, acoustic guitar, harmony guitar, production
- Kirk Hammett – lead guitar
- Jason Newsted – bass
- Lars Ulrich – drums, production

Technical Personnel

- Flemming Rasmussen – production, engineering
- Toby "Rage" Wright – assistant and additional engineering
- Steve Thompson, Michael Barbiero – mixing
- George Cowan – assistant mixing engineer
- Bob Ludwig – mastering
- George Marino – 1995 remastering
- Reuben Cohen – 2018 remastering

== Charts ==
=== Weekly charts ===
Chart (1989–1994)	Peak position
Australia (ARIA)	38
Australia (ARIA); Live version	5
Belgium (Ultratop 50 Flanders)	23
Denmark (IFPI)	5
Europe (Eurochart Hot 100)	9
Finland (Suomen virallinen lista)	1
Germany (GfK)	31
Ireland (IRMA)	12
Netherlands (Dutch Top 40)	3
Netherlands (Single Top 100)	3
New Zealand (Recorded Music NZ)	13
Norway (VG-lista)	4
Spain (AFYVE)	14
Sweden (Sverigetopplistan)	3
Switzerland (Schweizer Hitparade)	22
UK Singles (Official Charts)	13
US Billboard Hot 100	35
US Mainstream Rock (Billboard)	46

Chart (2026)	Peak position
Greece International (IFPI)	15

=== Year-end charts ===
Chart (1994)	Position
Europe (Eurochart Hot 100)	76
Netherlands (Dutch Top 40)	15
Netherlands (Single Top 100)	21
Sweden (Topplistan)	28

== Certifications ==
Region	Certification	Certified units/sales
Australia (ARIA)	4× Platinum	280,000^{‡}
Denmark (IFPI Danmark)	Gold	45,000^{‡}
United Kingdom (BPI) 2008 digital release	Gold	400,000^{‡}
Spain (Promusicae)	Gold	30,000^{‡}
United States (RIAA) Digital	5× Platinum	5,000,000^{‡}
United States (RIAA) Mastertone	Gold	500,000^{*}
United States (RIAA) Physical	Gold	500,000^{^}
Streaming
Greece (IFPI Greece)	Gold	1,000,000^{†}
^{*} Sales figures based on certification alone.^{^} Shipments figures based on certification alone.^{‡} Sales+streaming figures based on certification alone.^{†} Streaming-only figures based on certification alone.

== Honors ==
- "One" was voted as the seventh of the "100 Greatest Guitar Solos" of all time by readers of Guitar World, placed between "November Rain" by Guns N' Roses (sixth) and "Hotel California" by the Eagles (eighth).
- In 2011, a poll held by Gibson ranked the song the eighth greatest heavy metal song of all time.
- In 2002, 2009, 2011 and 2012, "One" was voted by listeners of the New Zealand radio station The Rock as the greatest rock song of all time.
- "One" was nominated for and won the first ever Grammy Award for Best Metal Performance in 1990.
- The comedy rock duo Tenacious D's song Tribute mentions the best song in the world, which the duo has stated in interviews was inspired by Metallica's song.

== See also ==
- List of anti-war songs
- Locked-in syndrome
