= Battery (song) =

Metallica song

Song by Metallica

from the album Master of Puppets
- Released: March 3, 1986
- Recorded: 1985
- Studio: Sweet Silence (Copenhagen)
- Genre: Thrash metal
- Length: 5:13
- Label: Elektra
- Composers: James Hetfield; Lars Ulrich
- Lyricist: James Hetfield
- Producers: Metallica; Flemming Rasmussen

"Battery" is a song by the American heavy metal band Metallica, and serves as the opening track to the band's third studio album, Master of Puppets.

== Background and composition ==
The song is composed in the key of E minor. It has a similar structure to "Fight Fire with Fire", the opening track of Metallica's previous album, Ride the Lightning (1984). The song begins with an acoustic guitar chord progression, overlayed with a simple melody on a second acoustic guitar. After several bars, the instrumentation abruptly crescendos to distorted electric guitars, along with the entrance of drums and bass guitar, continuing the chord progression and melody from the acoustic intro. This motif continues for several more bars until it transitions into a very fast thrash metal riff, which is the base for the rest of the song.

James Hetfield improvised the main riff to the song while relaxing in London.

== Lyrical meaning ==
The lyrics discuss control of anger over one's behavior. However, the theme of the song is based around the San Francisco thrash scene in the 1980s. The most prominent club played by Metallica was the Old Waldorf at 444 Battery Street in downtown San Francisco. The lyric "Cannot kill the family, Battery is found in me" is a statement that society does not understand the scene and that those within it ("the family") will defend it as a show of solidarity against the glam metal scene that was popular in the Los Angeles area. The tone of the song is of familial ties and the positive release of energy through interest in metal.

== Reception ==
AllMusic's Steve Huey called the songs "Battery" and "Damage, Inc." "two slices of thrash mayhem".

A readers' poll in Rolling Stone placed "Battery" at number 9 on its 10 Best Metallica Songs list.

Kerrang! ranked the song number 5 on its 20 Greatest Metallica Songs Ranked list, commenting, "Echoing Ride The Lightning's superb Fight Fire With Fire in its medieval-tinged acoustic opening before bombing headlong into a masterclass in lean, taut thrash metal, Battery was the fine-tuned statement of intent from a band ready to make their serrated sound a platinum success."

Revolver magazine hosted a fan poll and "Battery" was ranked number 4 out of "Top 5 Metallica Songs".

Loudwire ranked "Battery" at number 7 in its "Best Metallica Songs" list.

Billboard ranked the song at number 4 on its "Top Ten Greatest Metallica Songs" list.

In 2021, Eli Enis of Revolver included the song in his list of the "15 Greatest Album-Opening Songs in Metal".

== Performances ==
The song was first played live on March 27, 1986, along with the songs "Welcome Home (Sanitarium)" and "Damage, Inc".

"Battery" used to be a constant part of the band's live set list, frequently as either the opening or closing song. In some cases, it was used as a song before the intermission in concerts. Since 2008, the song shares its spot with other album openers such as "Blackened" or "Fight Fire with Fire", usually near the end of the main set or even in the encore, due to regular setlists rotation. When played live, the song may stop before the interlude and James Hetfield asks the crowd, "Are you alive?... How does it feel to be alive?" (This can be heard on the live album S&M.)

== Cover versions ==
- Eric Knudtsen (Flotsam & Jetsam), Dave Lombardo (Slayer), Mike Clark (Suicidal Tendencies) and Robert Trujillo (Suicidal Tendencies), 2000, on the tribute album Metallic Assault: A Tribute to Metallica. Lombardo played the song with Metallica on stage when Lars Ulrich missed the 2004 Download Festival, and Trujillo became a member of Metallica in 2003.
- Dream Theater, 2002, along with the entire Master of Puppets album, as part of its world tour in 2002, which has been released as an official bootleg recording.
- Machine Head, 2006, on the compilation album Remastered: Metallica's Master Of Puppets Revisited, and is also included as a bonus track on some versions of the band's album The Blackening.
- Van Canto, an a cappella metal band, on its 2006 debut album A Storm to Come.

== In popular culture ==
- The song appears in the 2011 indie film Hesher.

== Controversy ==
On August 13, 2018, a man named Chris Watts murdered his family. A report on the situation included how Watts Googled lyrics to Metallica's "Battery" after he had disposed of the bodies of his pregnant wife and children. It stirred up controversy in the media, some reports trying to link the song to the murder.

== Personnel ==
Credits are adapted from the Master of Puppets's liner notes.

Metallica

- James Hetfield – rhythm guitar, vocals
- Lars Ulrich – drums, percussion
- Cliff Burton – bass, backing vocals
- Kirk Hammett – lead guitar

Production

- Metallica – production
- Flemming Rasmussen – production, engineering
- Andy Wroblewski – assistant engineer
- Michael Wagener – mixing
- Mark Wilzcak – assistant mixing engineer
- George Marino – mastering, remastering on 1995 re-release
- Howie Weinberg, Gentry Studer – 2017 remastering

== Certifications ==
Region	Certification	Certified units/sales
Australia (ARIA)	Gold	35,000^{‡}
United States (RIAA)	Gold	500,000^{‡}
^{‡} Sales+streaming figures based on certification alone.
