= Cliff 'Em All =

Video by Metallica
- Released: November 17, 1987
- Genre: Thrash metal
- Length: 90:00
- Label: Elektra
- Producer: Curt Marvis, Jeff Richter

Metallica chronology
Cliff 'Em All (1987)	2 of One (1989)

Cliff 'Em All is a compilation of video footage, and the first video album by the American heavy metal band Metallica. It was released on November 17, 1987, as a tribute to Metallica's bassist Cliff Burton, who died in a tour bus accident on September 27, 1986, at the age of 24, near Ljungby, Sweden, during the European leg of their Master of Puppets world tour. Its title is derived from Metallica's debut album, Kill 'Em All. The home video also features a performance with former guitarist Dave Mustaine on March 19, 1983, shortly before his ousting from the band.

The video is a retrospective on the three and a half years that Cliff Burton was in Metallica, presented as a collection of bootleg footage shot by fans, some professional filming and TV shots that were never used and some of his best bass solos, personal photos and live concerts. Photos and narrations by the band (Lars Ulrich, James Hetfield and Kirk Hammett drinking beer) are placed between songs, which focus on Burton before fading into a title card of a performance. The video ends with the melodic interlude of "Orion" as pictures of Burton are shown.

With this video, the band tries to show the unique personality and style he had. While ostensibly the film focuses on Burton, it also has given fans a rare glimpse of Metallica's less-documented early career. This contrasts sharply with the 'Metallica business' represented in the feature film Metallica: Some Kind of Monster.

The back of the case reads "Well, we finally went and did what we always talked about not doing. Releasing a vid[eo]! Before you throw up in disgust, let us (except K.) tell you the idea behind this." The "K" is presumably short for Kirk, explaining why he is on the bottom of the cover.

== Songs ==
Detroit, April 4, 1986 – "supporting Ozzy"
Shot from the left of the stage. VG with closeups.

- "Creeping Death" (Hetfield/Ulrich/Burton/Hammett) – 6:18
- "Am I Evil?" (Harris/Tatler) – 4:15
- "Damage, Inc." (Hetfield/Ulrich/Burton/Hammett) – 5:10

Long Island, April 28, 1986 – "still drunk on Ozzy tour"
Shot from ground level above heads, VG with closeups

- "Master of Puppets" (Hetfield/Ulrich/Burton/Hammett) – 7:50

The Stone, San Francisco, March 19, 1983 – "Cliff's second gig"
Shot just above ground level, VG with closeups

- "(Anesthesia) Pulling Teeth" (Burton) – 4:21
- "Whiplash" (Hetfield/Ulrich) – 4:07

Germany, September 14, 1985 – "Metal Hammer Fest headlining with Venom, Nazareth, beer!"
Professionally shot video

- "Cliff Solo" – 2:00
- "The Four Horsemen" (Hetfield/Ulrich/Mustaine) – 5:03
- "Fade to Black" (Hetfield/Ulrich/Burton/Hammett) – 6:55
- "Seek & Destroy" (Hetfield/Ulrich) – 6:34

Denmark, July 6, 1986 – "Roskilde Festival with Phil Collins, Eric Clapton, Elvis Costello and Big Country"
Shot from ground level, with closeups

- "Welcome Home (Sanitarium)" (Hetfield/Ulrich/Hammett) – 6:30
- "(Anesthesia) Pulling Teeth" (Burton) – 3:10

Oakland, August 31, 1985 – "Day on the Green"
Professionally shot video

- "Cliff Solo"/"For Whom the Bell Tolls" (Hetfield/Ulrich/Burton) – 4:51

Chicago, August 12, 1983 – "Supporting Raven on the 'Kill Em All for One' tour"
Professionally shot video

- "No Remorse" (Hetfield/Ulrich) – 6:59
- "Metal Militia" (Hetfield/Ulrich/Mustaine) – 6:33

"Orion" (Burton/Hetfield/Ulrich) during end credits – 1:42

== Personnel ==
- Cliff Burton: bass, backing vocals
- James Hetfield: rhythm guitar, harmonized and first solo on "Master of Puppets", harmonized solo on "Orion", lead vocals
- Lars Ulrich: drums
- Kirk Hammett: lead guitar
- Dave Mustaine: lead guitar on "Whiplash"
