= Quebec Magnetic =

Video by Metallica
- Released: December 10, 2012
- Recorded: October 31 – November 1, 2009
- Venue: Colisée Pepsi (Quebec City)
- Genre: Heavy metal; thrash metal; speed metal
- Length: 176:59
- Label: Blackened
- Producer: Dana Marshall

Metallica chronology
The Big Four: Live from Sofia, Bulgaria (2010)	Quebec Magnetic (2012)

Quebec Magnetic is a live concert video album by Metallica, documenting two shows the band played at the Colisée Pepsi in Quebec City, Canada, on October 31 and November 1, 2009, on their World Magnetic Tour, released on December 10, 2012. The album is the first to be released via Metallica's own label, Blackened Recordings.

The album was announced on September 20, 2012, with fans voting online to decide which of the two shows recorded would be shown in its entirety; the remaining songs will be shown as "extras" on the album. On October 22, the album's track list, release date and cover art was released. A 33-second teaser trailer for the album was released on November 19.

The album sold about 14,000 copies during the first week after its release, charting at number two on the Billboard Top Music Videos chart.

== Track listing ==
The album contains songs from both shows, with songs not played in the main setlist included as extras.

Disc 1 (Full Concert)
No.	Title	Writer(s)	Length
1.	"The Ecstasy of Gold"	Ennio Morricone	1:36
2.	"That Was Just Your Life"	James Hetfield, Lars Ulrich, Kirk Hammett, Robert Trujillo	7:08
3.	"The End of the Line"	Hetfield, Ulrich, Hammett, Trujillo	7:46
4.	"The Four Horsemen"	Hetfield, Ulrich, Dave Mustaine	5:27
5.	"The Shortest Straw"	Hetfield, Ulrich	6:09
6.	"One"	Hetfield, Ulrich	7:54
7.	"Broken, Beat & Scarred"	Hetfield, Ulrich, Hammett, Trujillo	8:25
8.	"My Apocalypse"	Hetfield, Ulrich, Hammett, Trujillo	6:45
9.	"Sad but True"	Hetfield, Ulrich	6:00
10.	"Welcome Home (Sanitarium)"	Hetfield, Ulrich, Hammett	6:10
11.	"The Judas Kiss"	Hetfield, Ulrich, Hammett, Trujillo	9:48
12.	"The Day That Never Comes"	Hetfield, Ulrich, Hammett, Trujillo	7:58
13.	"Master of Puppets"	Cliff Burton, Hammett, Ulrich, Hetfield	8:05
14.	"Battery"	Hetfield, Ulrich	7:05
15.	"Nothing Else Matters"	Hetfield, Ulrich	5:47
16.	"Enter Sandman"	Hetfield, Ulrich, Hammett	8:49
17.	"Killing Time"	Vivian Campbell, Trevor Fleming, Raymond Haller, Davy Bates	2:55
18.	"Whiplash"	Hetfield, Ulrich	7:05
19.	"Seek & Destroy"	Hetfield, Ulrich	14:01
Total length:			2:14:53

Disc 2 (Bonus Tracks & Footage)
No.	Title	Writer(s)	Length
1.	"For Whom the Bell Tolls"	Burton, Hetfield, Ulrich	5:06
2.	"Holier Than Thou"	Hetfield, Ulrich	3:46
3.	"Cyanide"	Hetfield, Ulrich, Hammett, Trujillo	6:58
4.	"Turn the Page"	Bob Seger	5:18
5.	"All Nightmare Long"	Hetfield, Ulrich, Hammett, Trujillo	7:52
6.	"Damage, Inc."	Hetfield, Ulrich, Burton, Hammett	5:19
7.	"Breadfan"	Burke Shelley, Tony Bourge, Ray Phillips	4:09
8.	"Phantom Lord"	Hetfield, Ulrich, Mustaine	3:38
Total length:			42:06

Disc 2 (Extra)
No.	Title	Length
1.	"Quebec City Love Letters Featuring Band and Fan Interviews"	8:09
Total length:		50:15

== Personnel ==
- James Hetfield – vocals, rhythm guitar
- Kirk Hammett – lead guitar, backing vocals
- Robert Trujillo – bass, backing vocals
- Lars Ulrich – drums

== Chart positions ==
Chart (2012)	Peak position
Australian Music DVDs Chart	3
Austrian Music DVDs Chart	2
Belgian (Flanders) Music DVDs Chart	3
Dutch Music DVDs Chart	5
Finnish Music DVDs Chart	1
German Albums Chart	29
Hungarian Albums Chart	35
Italian Music DVDs Chart	8
Spanish Music DVDs Chart	9
Swiss Music DVDs Chart	1
UK Music Videos Chart	9
US Music Videos Chart	2

Chart (2013)	Peak position
Belgian (Wallonia) Music DVDs Chart	2
Danish Music DVDs Chart	4
Swedish Music DVDs Chart	1

== Certifications ==
Region	Certification	Certified units/sales
Australia (ARIA)	Platinum	15,000^{^}
Poland (ZPAV)	Platinum	10,000^{*}
^{*} Sales figures based on certification alone.^{^} Shipments figures based on certification alone.
