= Metallica: Through the Never (album) =

2013 live/soundtrack album by Metallica

Soundtrack album / live album by Metallica
- Released: September 24, 2013
- Recorded: August 17–18, 24–25, and 27, 2012
- Venues: Rexall Place in Edmonton, Alberta (August 17–18) and Rogers Arena in Vancouver, British Columbia (August 24, 25 and 27)
- Genres: Heavy metal, thrash metal
- Length: 101:13
- Label: Blackened Recordings
- Producer: Greg Fidelman

Metallica chronology
Beyond Magnetic (2011)	Metallica: Through the Never (2013)	Hardwired... to Self-Destruct (2016)

Professional ratings
Review scores
Source	Rating
Allmusic	4/5 stars
Consequence of Sound	D
Loudwire	4/5 stars

Metallica: Through the Never is a soundtrack album for the film of the same name, consisting of live recordings by American heavy metal band Metallica. It was released on September 24, 2013, via Blackened Recordings and has charted in several countries.

All tracks on the soundtrack are live recordings from their Canadian shows at Rexall Place in Edmonton, Alberta, on August 17 and 18, 2012, and Rogers Arena in Vancouver, British Columbia, on August 24, 25 and 27, 2012, with the exception of "Orion", which was recorded live at soundcheck.

== Track listing ==
Disc one
No.	Title	Writer(s)	Length
1.	"The Ecstasy of Gold"	Ennio Morricone	2:02
2.	"Creeping Death"	James Hetfield; Lars Ulrich; Cliff Burton; Kirk Hammett	6:20
3.	"For Whom the Bell Tolls"	Hetfield; Ulrich; Burton	4:40
4.	"Fuel"	Hetfield; Ulrich; Hammett	3:58
5.	"Ride the Lightning"	Hetfield; Ulrich; Burton; Dave Mustaine	6:55
6.	"One"	Hetfield; Ulrich	8:25
7.	"The Memory Remains"	Hetfield; Ulrich	5:43
8.	"Wherever I May Roam"	Hetfield; Ulrich	6:19
Total length:			44:22

Disc two
No.	Title	Writer(s)	Length
9.	"Cyanide"	Hetfield; Ulrich; Hammett; Robert Trujillo	7:02
10.	"...And Justice for All"	Hetfield; Ulrich; Hammett	9:18
11.	"Master of Puppets"	Hetfield; Ulrich; Burton; Hammett	8:26
12.	"Battery"	Hetfield; Ulrich	5:14
13.	"Nothing Else Matters"	Hetfield; Ulrich	7:22
14.	"Enter Sandman"	Hetfield; Ulrich; Hammett	6:22
15.	"Hit the Lights"	Hetfield; Ulrich	4:40
16.	"Orion (instrumental)"	Hetfield; Ulrich; Burton	8:27
Total length:			Disc two: 56:51; Total: 101:13

== Charts and certifications ==
=== Weekly charts ===
Chart (2013–14)	Peak position
Australian Albums (ARIA)	16
Austrian Albums (Ö3 Austria)	4
Belgian Albums (Ultratop Flanders)	9
Belgian Albums (Ultratop Wallonia)	14
Canadian Albums (Billboard)	9
Danish Albums (Hitlisten)	9
Dutch Albums (Album Top 100)	28
Finnish Albums (Suomen virallinen lista)	11
French Albums (SNEP)	32
German Albums (Offizielle Top 100)	8
Hungarian Albums (MAHASZ)	8
Irish Albums (IRMA)	31
Italian Albums (FIMI)	19
Japanese Albums (Oricon)	22
New Zealand Albums (RMNZ)	11
Norwegian Albums (VG-lista)	15
Polish Albums (ZPAV)	6
Portuguese Albums (AFP)	6
Scottish Albums (Official Charts)	27
Spanish Albums (Promusicae)	15
Swedish Albums (Sverigetopplistan)	32
Swiss Albums (Schweizer Hitparade)	16
US Billboard 200	9
US Top Rock Albums (Billboard)	4
US Soundtrack Albums (Billboard)	1

=== Year-end charts ===
Chart (2013)	Position
Belgian Albums (Ultratop Flanders)	119
US Soundtrack Albums (Billboard)	24
Chart (2014)	Position
Belgian Albums (Ultratop Flanders)	198

=== Certifications ===
Region	Certification	Certified units/sales
Poland (ZPAV)	Gold	10,000^{*}
Portugal (AFP)	Platinum	15,000^{^}
^{*} Sales figures based on certification alone.^{^} Shipments figures based on certification alone.

== Personnel ==
- James Hetfield – vocals, rhythm guitar, guitar solo on "Master Of Puppets" and "Nothing Else Matters"
- Kirk Hammett – lead guitar, backing vocals
- Robert Trujillo – bass, backing vocals
- Lars Ulrich – drums
