= Kill 'Em All =

Studio album by Metallica
- Released: July 25, 1983
- Recorded: May 10–27, 1983
- Studio: Music America (Rochester, New York)
- Genres: Thrash metal; speed metal
- Length: 51:20
- Label: Megaforce
- Producer: Paul Curcio

Metallica chronology
Kill 'Em All (1983)	Ride the Lightning (1984)

Singles from Kill 'Em All
- 1. "Whiplash" Released: August 8, 1983; 2. "Jump in the Fire" Released: January 20, 1984

Kill 'Em All is the debut album by the American heavy metal band Metallica, released on July 25, 1983, through the independent label Megaforce Records. After forming in 1981, Metallica began by playing shows in local clubs in Los Angeles. They recorded several demos to gain attention from club owners and eventually relocated to San Francisco to secure the services of bassist Cliff Burton. The group's No Life 'til Leather demo tape (1982) was noticed by Megaforce label head Jon Zazula, who signed them and provided a $15,000 recording budget (equivalent to $50,288.86 in 2026). Guitarist Dave Mustaine, who co-wrote several of Kill 'Em All's songs, was fired shortly before recording began; he was replaced by Kirk Hammett.

The album was recorded in May 1983 with producer Paul Curcio at the Music America Studios in Rochester, New York. It was originally intended to be titled Metal Up Your Ass, with cover art featuring a hand clutching a dagger emerging from a toilet bowl. Zazula convinced the band to change these because distributors feared that releasing an album with such an offensive title and artwork would diminish its chances of commercial success.

Metallica promoted the album on the two-month co-headlining Kill 'Em All for One tour with English heavy metal band Raven in the US. The album also generated two singles: "Whiplash" and "Jump in the Fire". Initially shipping 15,000 copies in the US, the album sold 60,000 copies worldwide by the end of Metallica's Seven Dates of Hell European tour in 1984. The album did not enter the Billboard 200 until 1986, when it peaked at number 155, following Metallica's commercial success with its third album, Master of Puppets; the 1988 Elektra reissue peaked at number 120.

Kill 'Em All was critically praised at the time of its release and has since been regarded as a groundbreaking album for thrash metal. It was also retrospectively placed on a few publications' best-album lists. The album's musical approach and lyrics were markedly different from the rock mainstream of the early 1980s and inspired several bands that followed similarly. It was certified 4× platinum by the Recording Industry Association of America (RIAA) in 2025 for shipping four million copies in the United States. The album was remastered and reissued as an expanded box set in 2016.

== Background and recording ==
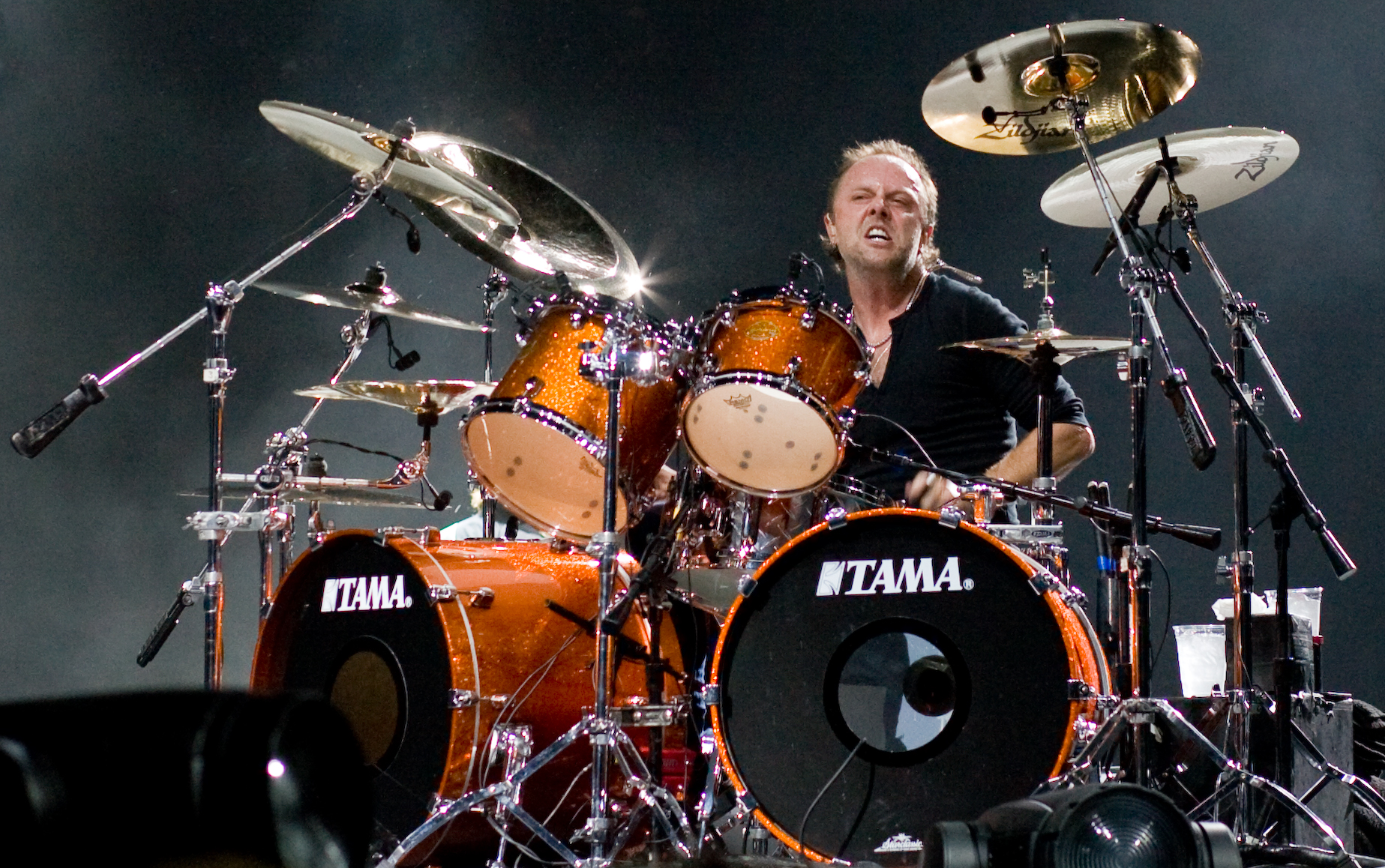
Lars Ulrich (pictured in 2008) founded Metallica through an advertisement in The Recycler. He picked the band's name from his friend Ron Quintana's list of names for his upcoming magazine. Ulrich suggested Metal Mania, secretly wanting to use Metallica as the band's name.

Metallica was formed in 1981 in Los Angeles by drummer Lars Ulrich and by vocalist/rhythm guitarist James Hetfield. Before settling on a definitive lineup, Metal Blade Records owner Brian Slagel asked Metallica to record a song for the first edition of his Metal Massacre compilation. Hetfield and Ulrich chose "Hit the Lights" from Hetfield's and his childhood friend Ron McGovney's previous band Leather Charm, and recorded it with Hetfield on vocals, McGovney on bass, and temporary guitarist Lloyd Grant. The band's first lineup featured Hetfield, Ulrich, McGovney, and guitarist Dave Mustaine, who was acquired through a newspaper advertisement. The band practiced in McGovney's garage and looked for gigs at local clubs. Metallica's first show was on March 14, 1982, at the Radio City in Anaheim. The nine-song set consisted of two originals ("Hit the Lights" and an unfinished version of "Jump in the Fire" from Mustaine's earlier band Panic) and covers of new wave of British heavy metal (NWOBHM) bands such as Diamond Head, Blitzkrieg, Savage, and Sweet Savage. The gig did not go as well as planned, because Mustaine had problems with the guitar distortion pedal, and broke a string during a song. Metallica's second gig was on March 27, 1982, at Hollywood's Whisky a Go Go, opening for Saxon. Although Mötley Crüe was originally scheduled to open the show, the group canceled because of its growing popularity. Metallica recorded a three-song demo to persuade the venue's management to allow the band to open for Saxon. Metallica's third concert was in April 1982, the first time "The Mechanix", written by Mustaine during his tenure with Panic, was played. Mustaine interacted with the fans at Metallica's earliest shows because Hetfield was shy.

To garner attention from club owners, Metallica recorded the Power Metal demo in April 1982, which featured "Motorbreath" in addition to the already-performed originals. The logo, displaying the band's name with the first and last letter drawn larger with sharp serifs and italicized, was designed by Hetfield. The No Life 'til Leather demo was recorded in July 1982, and it created a buzz in the underground tape trading circles. No Life 'til Leather featured a re-recorded version of "Hit the Lights", which appeared on the second pressing of Metal Massacre, in addition to new songs such as "Phantom Lord", "Seek & Destroy", and "Metal Militia". The recording and mastering were financed by Kenny Kane, owner of the punk label High Velocity, and distributed by Ulrich and his friend Pat Scott. Because of tensions with Mustaine, McGovney left the band in December. Ulrich was impressed by Cliff Burton's performance with Trauma at the Troubadour in West Hollywood, and offered to let him join the band. Burton joined on the condition that Metallica would relocate to the San Francisco area. Moving to El Cerrito in February 1983, the band stayed and rehearsed at Exodus manager Mark Whitaker's house, which they called the "Metallica Mansion". Metallica intended to record its debut in Los Angeles on Slagel's independent label on an $8,000 budget (equivalent to $25,860 in 2025). Slagel could not afford the record, and Ulrich contacted Jon Zazula, a New Jersey record-store owner and promoter of heavy metal bands on the East Coast who had already heard No Life 'til Leather. Metallica rented a U-Haul truck and drove to New Jersey in late March, and upon arrival, allowed Zazula to sell copies of No Life 'til Leather to help him found Megaforce Records because no label wanted to finance the album's recording.

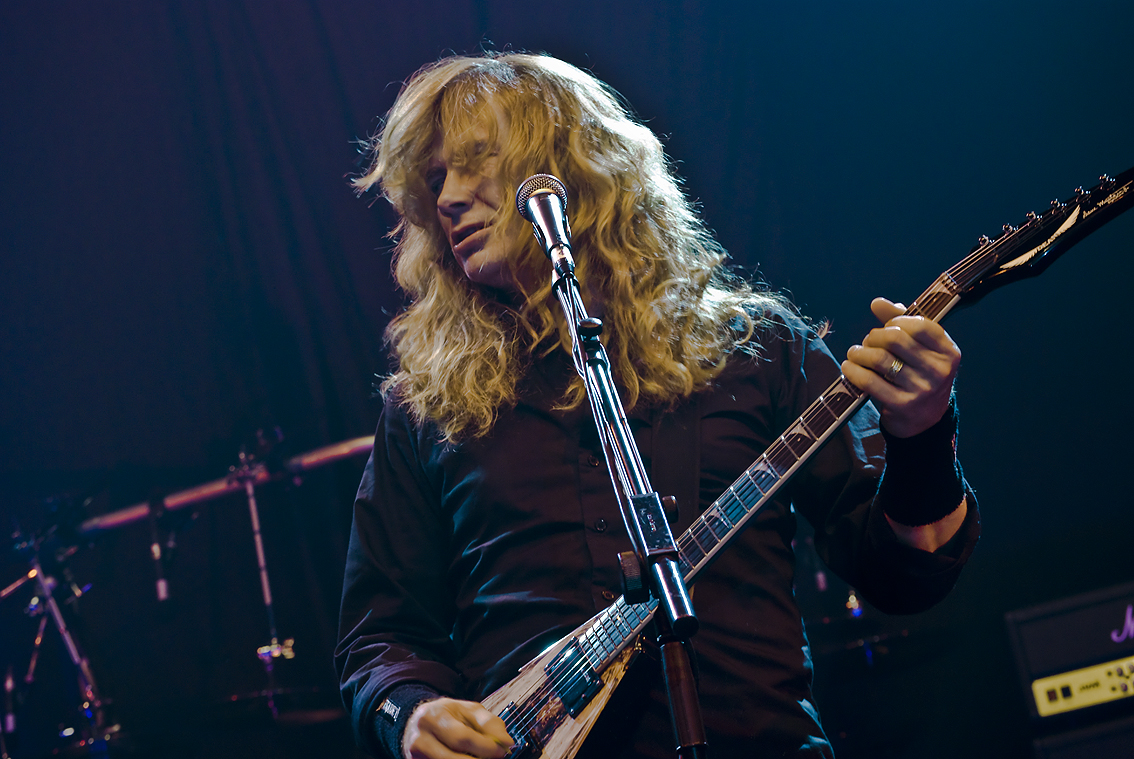
Dave Mustaine (pictured in 2005) was an early member of Metallica, and co-wrote several songs on Kill 'Em All. His erratic and violent behavior led to his expulsion from the band prior to recording the album.

Hetfield and Ulrich fired Mustaine on the morning of April 11 after a gig in New York, because of his drug and alcohol problems, overly aggressive behavior, and clashes with bandmates. On Whitaker's recommendation, Metallica recruited Kirk Hammett, who played in Exodus and was a one-time student of Joe Satriani. Hammett learned the songs on his flight to New York and started recording the album with Metallica barely a month later. Metallica met producer Paul Curcio at Music America Studios in Rochester, and recorded the album in two weeks. Unable to afford a hotel during the recording sessions, the band members stayed in people's houses in Rochester and at the Music Factory in Jamaica, Queens, where Anthrax held rehearsals. Curcio had set the studio equipment as if he were recording an ordinary rock band. He thought the initial tapes sounded very distorted and tried to compensate by turning down the knobs. Metallica resented Curcio's involvement because he seemed uninterested and had little impact on the sound. Although Zazula wanted Hammett to replicate Mustaine's solos, Hammett's guitar solos on the album were partially based on Mustaine's original solos, with the first four bars of most solos written by Mustaine before his departure. Despite their differences, Mustaine's contributions to the early years of Metallica were still acknowledged, and he received four co-writing credits on Kill 'Em All.

=== Mixing ===
Zazula was not pleased with the initial mix because he thought that the drums were too loud and the guitars were too low. The remix was done by sound engineer Chris Bubacz, according to Zazula's instructions. The final cost for the record, rounded to an estimated $15,000 (equivalent to $48,488 in 2025), nearly caused Zazula to go bankrupt. He later said, "This was mortgage money I'm spending, not something I've got put by I'm going to invest." The band members were absent from the mixing process, only communicating with Curcio and Bubacz through Zazula. After being displeased with the final mix, the band ensured that at least one member was present during mixing for future albums. Curcio later explained in a 2018 interview with Billboard: "When we came to mixing, I didn’t have them in the control room a few times because they were reaching over the engineer and grabbing the control knobs and just getting in the way. So I locked them out of the control room. My son always tells me that I was mean to them. I wasn’t mean; I was trying to get the album done." Zazula had a hard time finding a distributor for the record, but he eventually convinced Relativity Records to distribute the album in the US and Canada, and Music for Nations in Europe.

== Music and lyrics ==
"Kill 'Em All's lyrics created as much excitement as the band's music. Taken together, the words of the songs on the album form a single theme. It is a concept album that heralds the breakthrough of a new subgenre of metal, its fans, and its leader, Metallica. It is a celebration of metal. It is a call to arms to a new generation of metalheads, many of whom were already armed and ready."

— Deena Weinstein, Essays on Debut Albums

Kill 'Em All features intricate riffing reminiscent of the NWOBHM bands played at high velocity. The album is considered crucial in thrash metal's genesis because it introduced fast percussion, low-register chords, and shredding leads to the genre. Hammett played some pentatonic patterns in addition to his breakneck solos. Ulrich adopted a double time snare pattern that would become a mainstay on Metallica's subsequent albums. It is also notable for Ulrich's extensive use of the ride cymbal, a technique that became less prominent on subsequent Metallica albums as he increasingly favoured the China cymbal instead. Supported by his evolving drumming style, Ulrich later stated that he preferred the louder and washier sound of the China cymbal over the traditional "ping" of a ride cymbal. Hetfield's vocals evolved from the melodic wail on No Life 'til Leather to a rough-edged bark, and the entire band played faster and more accurately on Kill 'Em All. Author Joel McIver described Burton's and Hetfield's performances as nearly virtuosic, highlighting Burton's smooth-sounding bass and Hetfield's precise picking skills. According to journalist Chuck Eddy, the juvenile lyrical approach to topics such as warfare, violence and life on the road gives the album a "naive charm". The musical approach on Kill 'Em All was in contrast to the glam metal bands who dominated the charts in the early 1980s. Because of its rebellious nature and Metallica's street appearance, it appealed to fans who were not into the mainstream of hard rock.

"Hit the Lights" was based on an unfinished Leather Charm song written by Hetfield and Hugh Tanner. Hetfield had brought the majority of the song to Ulrich, and the two worked out different arrangements. Performed at 160 beats per minute, "Hit the Lights" opens with fade-in distorted guitars and a short shriek by Hetfield. The song is driven by the 16th note repeated main riff and the continuous eighth note snare drum hits. The lyrics celebrate heavy metal itself and are sung with short and high-pitched vocals. The song is different from the No Life 'til Leather version, featuring new guitar parts by Hammett, who said that he "really wanted to be flashy".

"The Four Horsemen"
"The Four Horsemen" is based on a galloping tremolo picked riff and double bass drum triplets. Its multipart concept preceded the more complex song structures Metallica applied on subsequent albums.

"The Four Horsemen" is a revamp of the Mustaine-penned "The Mechanix", which originally had lyrics about having sex at a gas station. A modified version of his composition with the original lyrics appeared on Megadeth's debut Killing Is My Business... and Business Is Good! (1985), named "Mechanix". Although Mustaine told Metallica not to use any of his music, Hetfield wrote lyrics about the Four Horsemen of the Apocalypse and added a bridge and a cleanly picked guitar solo in the middle. Mustaine said that the bridge was inspired by the main riff in Lynyrd Skynyrd's "Sweet Home Alabama".

"Motorbreath" was written by Hetfield during his time in Leather Charm and tells about life on the road. The song is based on a four-chord verse and a stop-and-start chorus. The most recognizable parts are Ulrich's drum rolls in each chorus and the riff that accompanies Hammett's solos.

"Jump in the Fire" was the first song ever written by Mustaine, with lyrics about teenage sexual experience. Mustaine explained that "Mechanix" and "Jump in the Fire" were the writings of a young man who experienced religious abuse from his mother's religion, Jehovah's Witnesses: "That kind of stuff really affected the way my myopic of the world and the prism that I saw it through." Hetfield's revised lyrics for the album were written from Satan's point of view, describing how the devil watches people killing each other, and is sure they will go to hell for their actions.

"(Anesthesia) – Pulling Teeth" is a bass solo by Burton, accompanied on drums by Ulrich. A staple of Burton's live performances since his high school days in the band Agents of Misfortune, the instrumental track featured Burton's distinctive "lead-bass" style of playing, incorporating heavy distortion, use of wah-wah pedal and tapping. Bubacz introduces the track as "Bass solo, take one", informing listeners that the song was recorded in one take. "(Anesthesia) – Pulling Teeth" was the bass solo that Burton was playing when Hetfield and Ulrich first saw him at a gig. Hetfield stated: "We heard this wild solo going on and thought, 'I don't see any guitar player up there.' We were both counting the strings and I finally turned to Lars and said, 'Dude, that's a bass!' Cliff was up there on stage with his band Trauma with a wah-wah pedal and his huge mop of red hair. He didn't care whether people were there. He was looking down at his bass, playing." For the album version, Cliff Burton insisted on recording this track alone in an empty room, while the studio technicians were downstairs. He made this recording in one take, after about twenty minutes of preparation.

"Whiplash" features a swift rhythm line of straight 16th notes played at about 200 beats per minute. Hetfield and Burton performed with palm muted technique and precise metronomic control. The lyrics celebrate crowd energy and headbanging. Rock journalist Mick Wall wrote that "Whiplash" signified the birth of thrash metal, stating: "If one wishes to identify the very moment thrash metal arrived spitting and snarling into the world, 'Whiplash' is indisputably it."

"Seek & Destroy"
The song opens with thin, mid-register guitars. The last two sections (5:50 onward) feature a palm-muted riff in low E. Since 2004, "Seek & Destroy" serves as the closer on Metallica's live set.

"Phantom Lord" is a lyrical nod to devilry. The song begins with a synthesized bass drone and contains a middle section with clean, arpeggiated guitar chords. Written by Mustaine, its central riff is in NWOBHM fashion.

"No Remorse" is a mid-tempo song that suddenly accelerates in tempo around the five-minute mark. The song was remodeled from its original version to match the rest of the album's style.

"Seek & Destroy" was inspired by Diamond Head's "Dead Reckoning" and is the first song Metallica recorded during the Kill 'Em All sessions. Hetfield wrote the main riff in his truck outside a Los Angeles sticker factory where he was working. Because of its simple, one-line chorus, the song became a permanent live fixture and a crowd singalong.

"Metal Militia", one of the fastest songs on the album, is about heavy metal's way of life and nonconformity. Mustaine composed the main riff, which emulates a marching army. The song ends with tramping feet and bullet ricochets in a fade-out.

== Artwork and title ==
Metallica intended to title the album Metal Up Your Ass with a cover featuring a hand clutching a dagger emerging from a toilet bowl. However, Zazula convinced them to change the title and artwork because he thought that they were too explicit for distributors to stock. The final cover featured the shadow of a hand letting go of a bloodied hammer. (Note: The hammer was owned by Burton, who carried it with him at all times.) Burton was credited with coming up with the name Kill 'Em All—referring to timid record distributors, saying, "Those record company fuckers ... kill 'em all!"—as a response to the situation. Ulrich thought Kill 'Em All was a good name, and Zazula agreed. Burton suggested to Gary L. Heard, also responsible for the Metallica photograph on the back cover, to feature a bloodied hammer on the album art. According to Hammett, "Cliff carried a hammer with him everywhere he went. He always had a hammer in his luggage, and he would take it out occasionally and start destroying things." Even though the original title was unused, the band did later release a "Metal Up Your Ass" T-shirt with the proposed artwork. A live bootleg recording of a 1982 performance at the Old Waldorf, titled Metal Up Your Ass (Live), featured the original cover artwork. Original pressings of the album came with an inner sleeve that included pictures and lyrics as well as a silver label on the vinyl. Subsequent pressings had a blank white sleeve and a standard album label. The 1988 reissue reintroduced the lyrics and photos. The original release can be distinguished by the silver labels with the track listing but without track lengths. Every issue produced has had the phrase "Bang That Head That Doesn't Bang". This phrase was dedicated to San Francisco fan Rich Burch, known for his headbanging at the band's early shows.

== Release and commercial performance ==
Kill 'Em All was released on July 25, 1983, by Megaforce with an initial pressing of 15,000 copies. Because of the label's financial restrictions, the album was pressed in batches of 500 copies. Kill 'Em All had sold 17,000 copies in the US by the end of the year. Similarly to punk rock acts, Metallica promoted its material through the tape trading network and independent music magazines such as Metal Forces in the UK and Metal Mania in the US. The album did not enter the Billboard 200 chart until 1986, when it peaked at number 155 following Metallica's commercial success with its third album Master of Puppets. The 1988 re-issue on Elektra Records also charted on the Billboard 200, peaking at number 120. It was certified 3× Platinum by the Recording Industry Association of America (RIAA) in 1999 for shipping three million copies in the United States. Despite being the lowest selling Metallica album, it helped the band establish its image and build a fanbase in its inaugural years.

"Whiplash" was the album's first single, issued on August 8, 1983. "Jump in the Fire" was released as a single in the UK on January 20, 1984, (Note: Released three days later in the US) to promote a UK tour with Venom. The single featured "Phantom Lord" and "Seek & Destroy" as live tracks, although they are actually studio recordings with fake crowd noise dubbed over them. The single's cover art features an oil painting titled The Devils of D-Day, created by artist Les Edwards in 1978.

== Critical reception ==
Professional ratings
Review scores
Source	Rating
AllMusic	5/5 stars
Chicago Tribune	3.5/4 stars
Collector's Guide to Heavy Metal	9/10
Encyclopedia of Popular Music	3/5 stars
The Guardian	4/5 stars
Kerrang!	5/5 stars
Metal Forces	10/10
Pitchfork	8.6/10
Q	4/5 stars
The Rolling Stone Album Guide	3/5 stars

Kill 'Em All received widespread critical acclaim. Bernard Doe of Metal Forces described Kill 'Em All as one of the fastest and heaviest albums ever recorded, and remarked that the album is not for the faint-hearted. Greg Kot of the Chicago Tribune acknowledged it as the "speed metal prototype", but felt the lyrical replication of Judas Priest and the Misfits kept the album short from becoming a classic. In a retrospective review, Billboard praised Kill 'Em All for changing the face of popular music with its unique combination of punk and metal. AllMusic's Steve Huey called it "the true birth of thrash". He praised Hetfield's highly technical rhythm guitar style and said that the band was "playing with tightly controlled fury even at the most ridiculously fast tempos". Rob Kemp, writing in The Rolling Stone Album Guide, credited the album for consolidating the punk rock and heavy metal scenes, but felt that apart from "Seek & Destroy" and "(Anesthesia) – Pulling Teeth", most of the album had the band "trying to look tough" over enthusiastic but unfinished riff-based songs.

Journalist Martin Popoff said Kill 'Em All differentiated from the debuts by Metallica's Bay Area contemporaries because the fans could identify with Hetfield's lyrics and the band's appearance. Spin's Chuck Eddy considered Kill 'Em All the inception of the "extreme metal mania" of the early 1980s. He noted the album did not receive much critical praise at the time of its release but said it aged well and opened the doors for the less commercially successful bands. Although McIver credits Venom's Welcome to Hell (1981) as the first thrash metal album, he acknowledged Kill 'Em All as a major influence on the flourishing American heavy metal scene. Despite its "less-than-perfect" production, Loudwire's Jon Wiederhorn said that Kill 'Em All sounds like an "influential slice of history" and stands on the same level as classic albums by Black Sabbath, Iron Maiden, and Judas Priest.

Kill 'Em All, as the first thrash metal album released in the US, had a substantial impact on the emerging scene and inspired numerous bands with its aggression and austere seriousness. Guitarist Kerry King acknowledged Slayer was still finding its sound while Metallica had already determined its image and musical identity. Anthrax guitarist Scott Ian was impressed by the album's heaviness and songwriting and said it influenced him as much as the albums by Iron Maiden. Dream Theater's drummer Mike Portnoy observed that Kill 'Em All surpassed the NWOBHM bands in terms of sheer velocity and cited Burton's bass solo as the album's peak. Guitarist Ulf Cederlund of Swedish black metal band Morbid cited "Motorbreath" and "Metal Militia" as songs that influenced him as a young musician. Kill 'Em All was ranked at number 35 on Rolling Stone's list of The 100 Greatest Albums of the '80s. Additionally, the album placed at number 54 on "The 100 Best Debut Albums of All Time" and again at number 35 on "100 Greatest Metal Albums of All Time", two lists compiled by the same magazine. Kerrang! listed the album at number 29 among the "100 Greatest Heavy Metal Albums of All Time". In 2010, Consequence of Sound ranked it number 94 among its "Top 100 Albums Ever".

== Touring ==
In late July 1983, Metallica embarked on the two-month Kill 'Em All for One tour with British co-headliners Raven. The tour name melded the titles of the albums the two bands were promoting: Metallica's Kill 'Em All and Raven's All for One, both released on Megaforce. The two groups met in Zazula's home two days before the tour began and traveled in the same vehicle throughout the tour with five roadies and sound engineer Whitaker. The tour was set to conclude with three shows in San Francisco, thus Hetfield painted "No Life 'til Frisco" on the Winnebago tour bus. The tour had a few poorly attended gigs, such as a performance at the Cheers club in Babylon, New York, attended by some 50 people. After the conclusion of Kill 'Em All for One in early September, Metallica returned to El Cerrito to work on new material. Seven weeks after the tour, Metallica booked several performances at Bay Area clubs, the first a Halloween gig at the Keystone in Palo Alto. At the Country Club in Reseda, the group debuted "Fight Fire with Fire" and "Creeping Death", along with an early version of "The Call of Ktulu", then titled "When Hell Freezes Over". Three days later, at a gig at The Stone in San Francisco, Metallica premiered "Ride the Lightning", the title track from the upcoming album. In December, Metallica went on a short tour in the Midwest and eastern United States with a three-man road crew: Whitaker, guitar technician John Marshall, and drum technician Dave Marrs. The concert of January 14, 1984, in Boston, was canceled because the band's equipment was stolen the night before.

In February, Metallica embarked on its first European trek with Twisted Sister, supporting Venom's Seven Dates of Hell tour. The tour was sponsored by Metallica's UK distributor, Music for Nations, who released the "Jump in the Fire" EP for that occasion. The first show was at the Volkshaus in Zurich on February 3. At the Aardschok Festival in Zwolle on February 11, Metallica played in front of 7,000 people, its largest audience at the time. The tour stretched through countries such as Italy, Germany, France, and Belgium, culminating in two sold-out shows at the Marquee Club in London. After the Seven Dates of Hell tour, Metallica headed to Sweet Silence Studios in Copenhagen to record its second album, Ride the Lightning. By the end of the tour, Kill 'Em All had sold 60,000 copies worldwide and Metallica began to gain international recognition. On June 8, 2013, at the Orion Festival, billed as the fictional band Dehaan, Metallica played the album in its entirety for the first time to mark the 30th anniversary of the album.

== Track listing ==
=== Original release ===
Side one
No.	Title	Writer(s)	Length
1.	"Hit the Lights"	James Hetfield; Lars Ulrich	4:17
2.	"The Four Horsemen"	Hetfield; Ulrich; Dave Mustaine	7:13
3.	"Motorbreath"	Hetfield	3:08
4.	"Jump in the Fire"	Hetfield; Ulrich; Mustaine	4:41
5.	"(Anesthesia) – Pulling Teeth" (Instrumental)	Cliff Burton	4:14
6.	"Whiplash"	Hetfield; Ulrich	4:08
Total length:			27:41

Side two
No.	Title	Writer(s)	Length
7.	"Phantom Lord"	Hetfield; Ulrich; Mustaine	5:01
8.	"No Remorse"	Hetfield; Ulrich	6:26
9.	"Seek & Destroy"	Hetfield; Ulrich	6:54
10.	"Metal Militia"	Hetfield; Ulrich; Mustaine	5:11
Total length:			23:39 (51:20)

The bonus tracks on the 1988 re-release were originally recorded as B-sides for the "Creeping Death" single in 1984, later known as Garage Days Revisited, and would later appear on the compilation album Garage Inc. (1998). The bonus tracks on the digital reissue were recorded live at Seattle Center Coliseum in Seattle, Washington, on August 29, 1989, and also appeared on the live album Live Shit: Binge & Purge (1993).

Bonus tracks (1988 Elektra reissue)
No.	Title	Writer(s)	Length
11.	"Am I Evil?" (Diamond Head cover)	Sean Harris; Brian Tatler	7:50
12.	"Blitzkrieg" (Blitzkrieg cover)	Brian Ross; Ian Jones; Jim Sirotto	3:37
Total length:			62:47

Bonus tracks (digital reissue)
No.	Title	Writer(s)	Length
11.	"The Four Horsemen" (live)	Hetfield; Ulrich; Mustaine
12.	"Whiplash" (live)	Hetfield; Ulrich

=== 2016 deluxe edition ===
In 2016, the album was remastered and reissued in a limited-edition deluxe box set with an expanded track listing and bonus content. The deluxe edition includes the original album on vinyl and CD, a picture disc with the original "Jump in the Fire" single track list, four CDs of interviews, rough mixes, and live recordings recorded from 1983 to 1984, and a DVD of a concert in Chicago.

== Personnel ==
Credits are adapted from the album's liner notes.

=== Metallica ===
- James Hetfield – rhythm guitar, vocals
- Lars Ulrich – drums
- Cliff Burton – bass guitar
- Kirk Hammett – lead guitar

=== Production ===
- Paul Curcio – production
- Jon Zazula – executive producer
- Chris Bubacz – engineer, introduction on "(Anesthesia) – Pulling Teeth"
- Andy Wroblewski – assistant engineer
- Jack Skinner – mastering
- Bob Ludwig – mastering (Elektra reissue)
- George Marino – 1995 remastering
- Howie Weinberg – 2016 remastering
- Metallica, Mark Whitaker – production on the Elektra reissue bonus tracks
- Jeffrey "Nik" Norman – engineer on the Elektra reissue bonus tracks

=== Artwork ===
- Gary L. Heard – front and back cover design photos
- Kevin Hodapp – inner sleeve photos
- Shari & Harold Risch – graphics, design, and layout

=== Digital reissue bonus tracks ===
- Jason Newsted – bass, backing vocals
- Mike Gillies – mixing

== Charts ==
Year	Chart	Peak position
1988	US Billboard 200	120
1993	Australian Albums Chart	55
2004	Canadian Metal Albums Chart (Nielsen Soundscan)	90
2004	Finnish Albums Chart	19
2004	French Albums Chart	149
2004	Swedish Albums Chart	28
2007	Finnish Albums Chart	12
2008	Spanish Albums Chart	70
2008	Swiss Albums Chart	65
2011	Swedish Albums Chart	39
2012	French Albums Chart	180
2016	German Albums Chart	58
2016	Spanish Albums Chart	82
2016	US Billboard 200	66
2017	Spanish Albums Chart	47
2018	Spanish Albums Chart	55
2019	French Albums Chart	179
2021	Polish Albums (ZPAV)	13
2021	US Top Rock Albums (Billboard)	18

2023 chart performance for Kill 'Em All
Chart (2023)	Peak position
Austrian Albums (Ö3 Austria)	54
German Albums (Offizielle Top 100)	17
Hungarian Physical Albums (MAHASZ)	33
Swiss Albums (Schweizer Hitparade)	31

== Certifications ==
Region	Certification	Certified units/sales
Argentina (CAPIF)	Platinum	60,000^{^}
Australia (ARIA)	2× Platinum	140,000^{‡}
Canada (Music Canada)	Platinum	100,000^{^}
Germany (BVMI)	Gold	250,000^{‡}
Italy (FIMI)	Gold	25,000^{‡}
Poland (ZPAV)	Platinum	20,000^{‡}
United Kingdom (BPI)	Gold	100,000^{*}
United States (RIAA)	4× Platinum	4,500,000
^{*} Sales figures based on certification alone.^{^} Shipments figures based on certification alone.^{‡} Sales+streaming figures based on certification alone.

== Bibliography ==
- Dome, Malcolm; Wall, Mick (2013). Metallica: The Music and the Mayhem. Omnibus Press. ISBN 978-0-85712-721-1.
- Clerc, Benoît (2023). Metallica All the Songs: The Story Behind Every Track. London: Cassell. ISBN 978-1-78472-893-9.
- Gulla, Bob (2013). Guitar Gods: The 25 Players Who Made Rock History. ABC-CLIO. ISBN 978-0-313-35806-7.
- Harrison, Thomas (2011). Music of the 1980s. ABC-CLIO. ISBN 978-0-313-36600-0.
- Heatley, Michael; Lester, Paul; Roberts, Chris, eds. (1998). The Encyclopedia of Albums. Dempsey Parr. ISBN 978-1-84084-031-5.
- Irwin, William (2009). "The Search Goes On: Christian, Warrior, Buddhist". In Irwin, William (ed.). Metallica and Philosophy: A Crash Course in Brain Surgery. John Wiley & Sons. pp. 16–28. ISBN 978-1-4051-6348-4.
- Kahn-Harris, Keith (2007). Extreme Metal: Music and Culture on the Edge. Berg Publishers. ISBN 978-1-84520-398-6.
- Kemp, Rob (2004). "Metallica". In Brackett, Nathan; Hoard, Christian David (eds.). The New Rolling Stone Album Guide. Simon & Schuster. pp. 538, 539. ISBN 0-7432-0169-8.
- Larkin, Colin, ed. (2006). Encyclopedia of Popular Music. Vol. 5 (4th ed.). Oxford University Press. ISBN 0-19-531373-9.
- McIver, Joel (2009). To Live Is to Die: The Life and Death of Metallica's Cliff Burton. Omnibus Press. ISBN 978-1-906002-24-4.
- McIver, Joel (2014). Justice for All — The Truth About Metallica. Omnibus Press. ISBN 978-1-78323-123-2.
- Nys, Thomas (2009). "Through the Mist and the Madness: Metallica's Message of Nonconformity, Individuality, and Truth". In Irwin, William (ed.). Metallica and Philosophy: A Crash Course in Brain Surgery. John Wiley & Sons. pp. 41–52. ISBN 978-1-4051-6348-4.
- Pillsbury, Glenn (2006). Damage Incorporated: Metallica and the Production of Musical Identity. Routledge. ISBN 978-0-415-97374-8.
- Popoff, Martin (2005). The Collector's Guide to Heavy Metal: The Eighties. Vol. 2. Collector's Guide Publishing. ISBN 978-1-894959-31-5.
- Popoff, Martin (2013). Metallica: The Complete Illustrated History. Voyageur Press. ISBN 978-0-7603-4482-8.
- Wagner, Jeff (2010). Mean Deviation: Four Decades of Progressive Heavy Metal. Bazillion Points Books. ISBN 978-0-9796163-3-4.
- Wall, Mick (2010). Enter Night: A Biography of Metallica. Orion Publishing Group. ISBN 978-1-40911-297-6.
- Weinstein, Deena (2013). "Metallica Kills". In Plasketes, George (ed.). Please Allow Me to Introduce Myself: Essays on Debut Albums. Ashgate Publishing, Ltd. pp. 149–56. ISBN 978-1-472-40280-6.
- Winwood, Ian; Brannigan, Paul (2013). Birth School Metallica Death. Vol. 1. Faber & Faber. ISBN 978-0-571-29416-9.
