= Ride the Lightning =

Studio album by Metallica
- Released: July 27, 1984
- Recorded: February 20 – March 14, 1984
- Studio: Sweet Silence (Copenhagen)
- Genres: Thrash metal; heavy metal
- Length: 47:26
- Label: Megaforce
- Producers: Metallica; Flemming Rasmussen; Mark Whitaker

Metallica chronology
Kill 'Em All (1983)	Ride the Lightning (1984)	Master of Puppets (1986)

Singles from Ride the Lightning
- 1. "Creeping Death" Released: November 23, 1984

Ride the Lightning is the second studio album by the American heavy metal band Metallica, released on July 27, 1984, by the independent record label Megaforce Records. The album was recorded in three weeks with producer Flemming Rasmussen at Sweet Silence Studios in Copenhagen, Denmark. The artwork, based on a concept by the band, depicts an electric chair being struck by lightning flowing from the band logo. The title was taken from a passage in Stephen King's novel The Stand, in which a character uses the phrase to refer to execution by electric chair.

Although rooted in the thrash metal genre, the album showcased the band's musical growth and lyrical sophistication. Bassist Cliff Burton introduced the basics of music theory to the band and had more input in the songwriting. Beyond the fast tempos of its debut Kill 'Em All, Metallica broadened its approach by employing acoustic guitars, extended instrumentals, and more complex harmonies. The overall recording costs were paid by Metallica's European label Music for Nations because Megaforce was unable to cover it. It is the last album to feature songwriting contributions from former lead guitarist Dave Mustaine, and the first to feature contributions from successor Kirk Hammett.

Ride the Lightning received a highly positive response from music critics, who saw it as a more ambitious effort than its predecessor. Metallica promoted the album on the Bang That Head That Doesn't Bang European tour in late 1984, and on its North American leg in the first half of 1985. The band performed at major music festivals such as Monsters of Rock and Day on the Green later that year. Two months after its release, Elektra Records signed Metallica to a multi-year deal and reissued the album. Ride the Lightning peaked at number 100 on the Billboard 200 with virtually no radio exposure and has since reached number 48. Although 75,000 copies were initially pressed for the American market, the album sold half a million by November 1987. It was certified 6× platinum by the Recording Industry Association of America (RIAA) in 2012 for shipping six million copies in the United States. Many rock publications have ranked Ride the Lightning on their best album lists, saying it had a lasting impact on thrash metal. The album was remastered and reissued as an expanded box set in 2016.

== Background and recording ==
Metallica released its debut album, Kill 'Em All, on the independent label Megaforce Records on July 25, 1983. The album helped to establish thrash metal, a heavy metal subgenre defined by its brisk riffs and intense percussion. After finishing its promotional tour, Metallica began composing new material, and from September, began performing the songs that were to make up Ride the Lightning at concerts. Because the band had little money, its members often ate one meal a day and stayed at fans' homes while playing at clubs across the United States. An incident occurred when part of Metallica's gear was stolen in Boston, and Anthrax lent Metallica some of its equipment to complete the remaining dates. When not gigging, the band stayed in a rented house in El Cerrito, California, called the Metallica Mansion.

Hetfield gradually built confidence as lead vocalist and kept his original role. Metallica started recording on February 20, 1984, at Sweet Silence Studios in Copenhagen, Denmark. The album was co-produced by Flemming Rasmussen, the founder of Sweet Silence Studios. Drummer Lars Ulrich chose Rasmussen because he liked his work on Rainbow's Difficult to Cure (1981) and was keen to record in Europe. Rasmussen, who had not heard of Metallica, agreed to work on the album, even though his studio employees questioned the band's talent. Rasmussen listened to Metallica's tapes before the members arrived and thought the band had great potential. Metallica rehearsed the album's material at Mercyful Fate's practice room in Copenhagen.

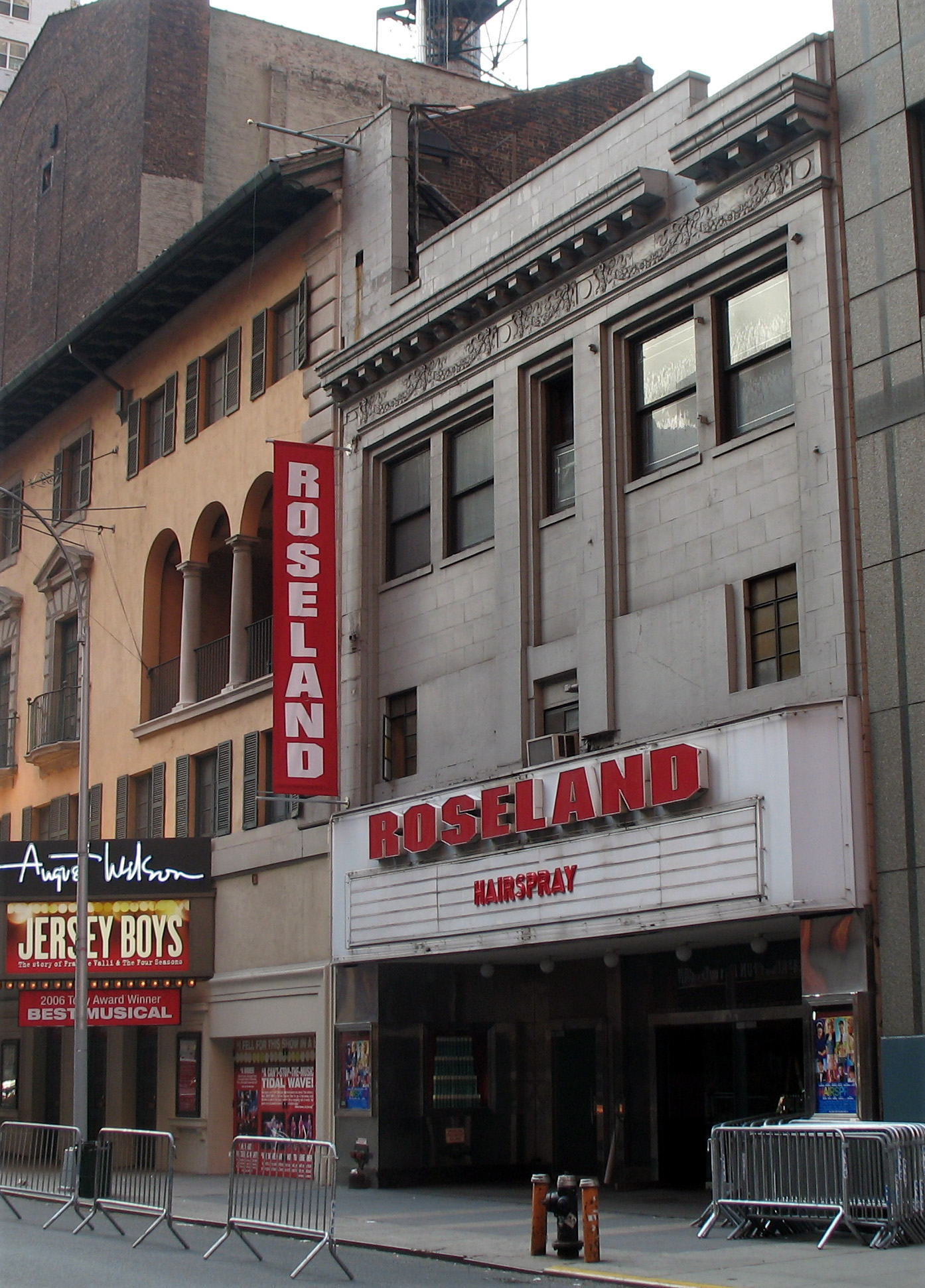
Metallica appeared second and played ten songs at the sold-out show at New York City's Roseland Ballroom on August 3, 1984.

Before entering the studio, Metallica collected ideas on "riff tape" recordings of various jam sessions. Hetfield and Ulrich went through the tapes and selected the strongest riffs to assemble into songs. Together, they record the basic tracks live - only rhythm guitar and drums - with Kirk Hammett and Cliff Burton adding their parts later. Rasmussen, with the support of drum roadie Flemming Larsen, taught the basics of timing and beat duration to Ulrich, who had a tendency to increase speed and had little knowledge of rhythm theory. Drums were recorded in an empty warehouse at the back of the studio, which was not soundproof, and caused reverberation. Although four tracks were already arranged, the band members were not used to creating songs in the studio, as they had not done so for Kill 'Em All. "For Whom the Bell Tolls", "Trapped Under Ice", and "Escape" were written mostly in Copenhagen, and the band put finishing touches on "Fight Fire with Fire", "Ride the Lightning", "Creeping Death", and "The Call of Ktulu", which had already been performed live.

Lead guitarist Kirk Hammett took the album's name from a passage in Stephen King's novel The Stand. The cover art, displaying an electric chair in the midst of lightning bolts, was conceived before recording began. Metallica initially had difficulty recording because gear was stolen three weeks before the band arrived in Copenhagen. The band members slept in the studio by day as they could not afford a hotel and recorded by night, because the studio was booked by other artists during the daytime. Because the group was looking for a major label deal, several A&R representatives from different labels visited the studio. At first, it seemed that Metallica was going to sign with Bronze Records, but the deal was canceled, because Bronze executive Gerry Bron did not appreciate the work done at Sweet Silence Studios, and wanted the US edition to be remixed by engineer Eddie Kramer, and even considered re-recording the album in another studio. Metallica was put off by Bron's failure to share the band's artistic vision and decided to look for another label for the US release, though Bronze had already advertised Metallica as one of its bands.

Metallica had to record quickly because of European shows scheduled 29 days after entering the studio. Recording finished on March 14, and Megaforce released the album on July 27. Although the original album budget was $20,000, the final expense was above US$30,000 (equivalent to $96,976 in 2025). Metallica's European label Music for Nations paid the studio costs because Megaforce owner Jon Zazula could not afford them. Metallica was unhappy with the lack of promotion by Megaforce, and decided to part ways with Zazula. Major label Elektra Records A&R executive Michael Alago noticed Metallica at The Stone gig in San Francisco, and invited Elektra's chairman and the head of promotion to see the August show in New York. The performance at Roseland Ballroom, with Anthrax and Metallica opening for Raven, pleased the Elektra staff, and the band was offered a contract the following morning. On September 12, Metallica signed with Elektra, which re-released the album on November 19. Cliff Burnstein and Peter Mensch of Q Prime were concurrently appointed as the band's new managers. Ride the Lightning is the last Metallica album to feature co-writing contributions from former lead guitarist Dave Mustaine, who received credit on the title track and "The Call of Ktulu". The album also represented the first time Hammett was given writing credits.

== Music and lyrics ==
Music writers opine that Ride the Lightning exhibits greater musical maturity, with sonically broader songs than Kill 'Em All, which was noted for its one-dimensional sound. This development is partially because of bassist Cliff Burton's knowledge of music theory. He showed Hetfield how to augment core notes with complementary counter-melodies and how basic guitar harmony works, which reflected on the song compositions. Hetfield developed more socially aware lyrics, as well as ominous and semi-philosophical references. Ulrich explained that Metallica opted not to rely strictly on fast tempos as on the previous album, but to explore other musical approaches that sounded powerful and heavy. Grinder magazine's Kevin Fisher summarized the album as "ultimate thrash, destruction and total blur" that reminded him of the speed and power of Kill 'Em All. Music journalist Martin Popoff observed that Ride the Lightning offered "sophistication and brutality in equal measure" and was seen as something new at the time of its release. Discussing the album's lyrical content, philosopher William Irwin wrote: "After Kill 'Em All, the rebellion and aggression became much more focused as the enemy became more clearly defined. Metallica was deeply concerned about various domains in which the common man was wrongfully yet ingeniously deceived. More precisely, they were highly critical of those in power".

"Ride the Lightning"
The title track's sound has a foreboding mood suiting the morbid lyrics. Hetfield recorded his guitar parts relatively fast and overlaid them with two more takes played live, instead of overdubbing them.

The major-key acoustic introduction to "Fight Fire with Fire" displays Metallica's evolution towards a more harmonically complex style of songwriting. The fastest Metallica song in terms of picking speed, it is driven by nimbly tremolo-picked riffs in the verses and chorus. The extended solo at the end dissolves in a sound effect of a vast nuclear explosion. The main riff was taped during the Kill 'Em All Tour and the acoustic intro was something Burton was playing on acoustic guitar at the time. The lyrical themes focused on nuclear annihilation, and specifically critiques the doctrine of Mutual Assured Destruction.

"Ride the Lightning" is Metallica's first song to have emphasized the misery of the criminal justice system. The lyrics are in the perspective of a death row inmate anticipating execution by the electric chair. The song, one of the two album tracks that credits Mustaine, begins in a mid-tempo which gradually accelerates as the song progresses. One of the riffs, originally composed by Mustaine, was simplified. It features an instrumental middle section highlighted by Hammett's soloing. According to Hetfield, the song is not a criticism of capital punishment, but a tale of a man sentenced to death for a crime he did not commit, as in the opening lyrics: "Guilty as charged/But damn it/It ain't right". The song would later be covered by Mustaine's own band, Megadeth, in 2026.

"Fade to Black"
"Fade to Black" has a similar structure to Lynyrd Skynyrd's "Free Bird". The use of acoustic guitars and clean vocals alienated some of Metallica's fanbase at the time.

"For Whom the Bell Tolls" begins with a bell tolling, followed by a marching riff and high-register bass melody. The chromatic introduction, which Burton wrote before he joined Metallica, is often mistaken for an electric guitar but is actually Burton's bass guitar augmented with distortion and a wah-wah pedal. The lyrics were inspired by Ernest Hemingway's 1940 novel of the same name, which explores the horror and dishonor of modern warfare.

"Fade to Black" is a power ballad with lyrics about suicide. Hetfield wrote the words because he felt powerless after the band's equipment was stolen before the January 1984 show in Boston. Musically, the song begins with an acoustic guitar introduction overlaid with electric soloing. The song becomes progressively heavier and faster, ending with multi-layered guitar solos. The ballad's arpeggiated chords and reserved singing was incongruous for thrash metal bands at the time and disappointed some of Metallica's fans. The song's structure foreshadows later Metallica ballads, "Welcome Home (Sanitarium)", "One", and "The Day That Never Comes". "Fade to Black" was released as a promotional single in 1984, in phosphorescent green.

"Trapped Under Ice" is about a person who wakes from a cryonic state. Realizing there is nowhere to go, and no-one will come to the rescue, the person helplessly awaits impending doom. The song is built on a fast-picked galloping riff, reminiscent of the album's opener. It was inspired by a track Hammett's former band Exodus had demoed called "Impaler", which was later released on that band's 2004 album Tempo of the Damned.

"Escape" was originally titled "The Hammer" and was intended to be released as a single due to its lighter riffs and conventional song structure. The intro features a counterpoint bass melody and a chugging guitar riff that resolves into a standard down-picked riff. "Escape" is Hetfield's most disliked Metallica song, due to it being the result of the record company forcing Metallica to write something more radio friendly. Book authors Mick Wall and Malcolm Dome said the song was influenced by the album-oriented rock of 1970s bands such as Journey and Foreigner, but fans perceived it as an attempt for airplay on rock radio. Metallica has so far performed "Escape" live only once, at the 2012 Orion Music + More festival, while performing Ride the Lightning in its entirety.

"Creeping Death" describes the Plague of the Death of the Firstborn (Exodus 12:29). The lyrics deal with the ten plagues visited on Ancient Egypt; four of them are mentioned throughout the song, as well as the Passover. The title was inspired by a scene from The Ten Commandments while the band was watching the movie at Burton's house. The bridge, with its chant "Die, by my hand!", was originally written by Hammett for the song "Die by His Hand" while he was playing in Exodus, who recorded it as a demo but did not feature it on an album. Journalist Joel McIver called the song a "moshpit anthem" due to its epic lyrical themes and dramatic atmosphere.

"The Call of Ktulu", tentatively titled "When Hell Freezes Over", was inspired by H. P. Lovecraft's book The Shadow over Innsmouth, which was introduced to the rest of the band by Burton. The title was taken from one of Lovecraft's key stories featuring Cthulhu, The Call of Cthulhu, although the original name was modified to "Ktulu" for easier pronunciation. The track begins with a D minor chord progression in the intro, written by Mustaine (Mustaine later re-used the chord structure on Megadeth's track "Hangar 18") followed by a two-minute bass solo over a rhythmic riff pattern. Conductor Michael Kamen rearranged the piece for Metallica's 1999 S&M project and won a Grammy Award for Best Rock Instrumental Performance in 2001.

== Release ==
Ride the Lightning was released on July 27, 1984. Megaforce initially pressed 75,000 copies of the album for the US market, while Music for Nations serviced the European market. By late 1984, 85,000 copies of Ride the Lightning had been sold in Europe, resulting in Metallica's first cover story for Kerrang! in its December issue. The album peaked at number 100 on the Billboard 200 with no radio exposure. Ride the Lightning went gold by November 1987 and in 2012 was certified 6× platinum by the Recording Industry Association of America (RIAA) for six million copies shipped in the US.

After signing Metallica, Elektra released the single "Creeping Death" in a sleeve depicting a bridge and a skull painted grey and green. The single appeared with a B-side titled Garage Days Revisited made up of covers of Diamond Head's "Am I Evil?" and Blitzkrieg's "Blitzkrieg". Elektra also released "For Whom the Bell Tolls" and "Fade to Black" as promotional singles in 1984; the former in two versions, an edit on side A and the album version on side B, and the latter only the album version.

== Reception and legacy ==
Professional ratings
Review scores
Source	Rating
AllMusic	5/5 stars
Chicago Tribune	3/4 stars
Collector's Guide to Heavy Metal	10/10
Encyclopedia of Popular Music	3/5 stars
The Guardian	5/5 stars
Pitchfork	10/10
Q	4/5 stars
Rock Hard	10/10
The Rolling Stone Album Guide	4/5 stars
Sputnikmusic	5/5 stars

Ride the Lightning received widespread acclaim from music critics. According to Q magazine, the album confirmed Metallica's status as the leading heavy metal band of the modern era. The magazine credited the group for redefining the norms of thrash metal with "Fade to Black", the genre's first power ballad. British rock magazine Kerrang! stated that the album's maturity and musical intelligence helped Metallica expand heavy metal's boundaries. Greg Kot of the Chicago Tribune described Ride the Lightning as a more refined extension of the group's debut. In a retrospective review, Sputnikmusic's Channing Freeman named it as one of the few albums that can be charming and powerful at the same time. He praised Hetfield's vocal performance and concluded that Metallica was "firing on all cylinders". AllMusic's Steve Huey saw the album as a more ambitious and remarkable effort than Kill 'Em All. He called Ride the Lightning an "all-time metal classic" because of the band's rich musical imagination and lyrics that avoided heavy metal cliches.

The Rolling Stone Album Guide viewed the album as a great step forward for the band and as an album that established the concept for Metallica's following two records. Colin Larkin, writing in the Encyclopedia of Popular Music, singled out "For Whom the Bell Tolls" as an example of Metallica's growing music potential. Popoff regards Ride the Lightning as an album where "extreme metal became art". "This literally was the first album since (Judas Priest's 1976) Sad Wings of Destiny where the rulebook has changed. This was a new kind of heaviness; the soft, billowy but explosive production was amazing, the speed was superhuman", stated Popoff. Reviewing the 2016 reissue, Jason Anderson of Uncut considers Ride the Lightning the second best Metallica album which set the pace for metal in the years to come.

The album, along with Kill 'Em All, was reissued in 2016 as a boxed set including demos and live recordings. Many rock publications have ranked Ride the Lightning on their best album lists. The album placed fifth on IGN Music's "Top 25 Metal Albums" list. Spin listed it as a thrash metal essential, declaring it "the thrashiest thrash ever". According to Guitar World, Ride the Lightning "didn't just change the band's trajectory—it reset the course of metal itself". Corey Deiterman of the Houston Press considers Ride the Lightning the most influential Metallica album, saying it had a lasting impact on genres such as crossover thrash and hardcore punk. In 2017, it was ranked 11th on Rolling Stone's list of "100 Greatest Metal Albums of All Time". In a 1991 interview, Jason Newsted stated that Ride the Lightning was next to Metallica, "the best album ever".

== Touring ==
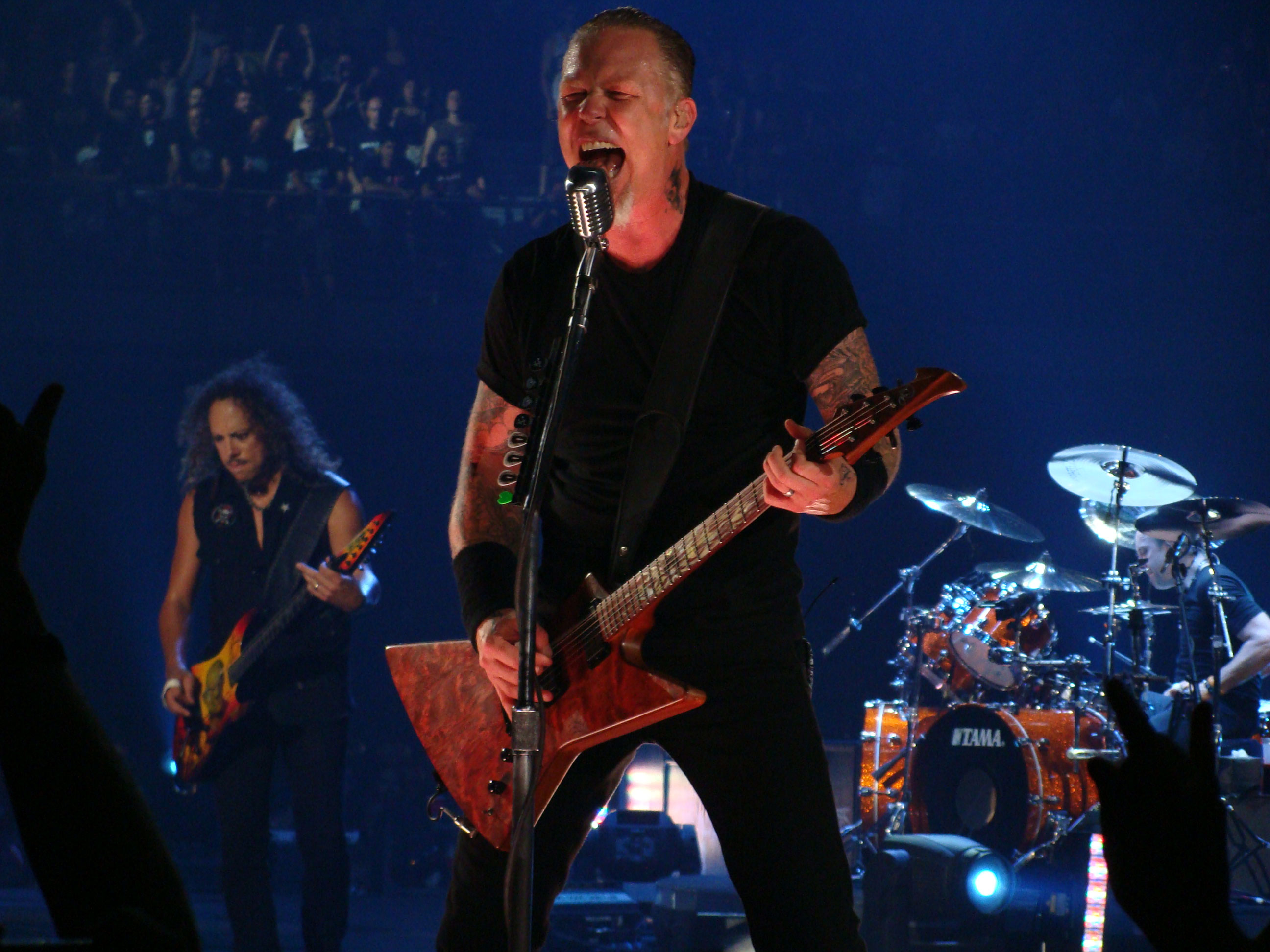
Metallica (pictured in 2009) began using Ennio Morricone's "The Ecstasy of Gold" as its concert introduction music in 1984.

After recording was completed, Music for Nations founder Martin Hooker wanted to arrange a triple-bill UK tour in March / April 1984 with Exciter, Metallica, and the Rods. The Hell on Earth Tour never materialized because of poor ticket sales. To promote Ride the Lightning, Metallica commenced the Bang That Head That Doesn't Bang European tour on November 16, in Rouen, France, with English new wave band Tank as support. The tour continued with dates in Belgium, Italy, Germany, and the Nordic countries to an average crowd of 1,300. After a Christmas break, the group embarked on a 50-date North American tour, first as a co-headlining act with W.A.S.P. and then as headliners with Armored Saint supporting.

The American leg ended in March 1985, and the band spent the following months working on the next album, Master of Puppets, whose recording sessions were scheduled to begin in September. Metallica performed at the Monsters of Rock festival held at Castle Donington in England on August 17 in front of 70,000 fans. The band was placed between Ratt and Bon Jovi, two glam metal groups whose sound and appearance were much unlike Metallica's. At the start of the set, Hetfield pronounced to the audience: "If you came here to see spandex, eye make-up, and the words 'oh baby' in every fuckin' song, this ain't the fuckin' band!" Two weeks later, Metallica appeared on the Day on the Green festival in Oakland, California, before 90,000 people. The last show Metallica played before recording began was the Loreley Metal Hammer Festival in Germany, headlined by Venom. "Disposable Heroes" from the upcoming album was performed live for the first time at this festival. Metallica finished 1985 with a show at the Sacramento Memorial Auditorium on December 29 opening for Y&T, and a New Year's Eve concert at the Civic Auditorium in San Francisco on a bill with Metal Church, Exodus, and Megadeth, the first time Metallica and Megadeth shared a stage. At this gig, Metallica premiered "Master of Puppets" from the then-upcoming third album.

== Track listing ==
Side one
No.	Title	Writer(s)	Length
1.	"Fight Fire with Fire"	James Hetfield; Lars Ulrich; Cliff Burton	4:44
2.	"Ride the Lightning"	Hetfield; Ulrich; Burton; Dave Mustaine	6:37
3.	"For Whom the Bell Tolls"	Hetfield; Ulrich; Burton	5:11
4.	"Fade to Black"	Hetfield; Ulrich; Burton; Kirk Hammett	6:55

Side two
No.	Title	Writer(s)	Length
5.	"Trapped Under Ice"	Hetfield; Ulrich; Hammett	4:04
6.	"Escape"	Hetfield; Ulrich; Hammett	4:24
7.	"Creeping Death"	Hetfield; Ulrich; Burton; Hammett	6:36
8.	"The Call of Ktulu" (instrumental)	Hetfield; Ulrich; Burton; Mustaine	8:55
Total length:			47:26

The bonus tracks on the digital re-release were recorded live at the Seattle Coliseum, Seattle, Washington, on August 29 and 30, 1989, and later appeared on the live album Live Shit: Binge & Purge (1993).

Bonus tracks (digital reissue)
No.	Title	Writer(s)	Length
9.	"For Whom the Bell Tolls" (live)	Hetfield; Ulrich; Burton	5:35
10.	"Creeping Death" (live)	Hetfield; Ulrich; Burton; Hammett	8:12
Total length:			61:15

=== 2016 deluxe box set ===
In 2016, the album was remastered and reissued in a limited-edition deluxe box set with an expanded track listing and bonus content. The deluxe edition set includes the original album on vinyl and CD, with an additional vinyl record containing a live show recorded in Los Angeles, a picture disc containing the "Creeping Death" single tracklist, six CDs of live recordings, interviews, rough mixes, and demos recorded from 1984 to 1985, and one DVD of live shows and interviews with the band.

== Personnel ==
Credits are adapted from the album's liner notes, except where noted.

Metallica

- James Hetfield – rhythm guitar, vocals, acoustic guitar on "Fade to Black"
- Lars Ulrich – drums, anvil on "For Whom the Bell Tolls", backing vocals on "Creeping Death"
- Cliff Burton – bass, backing vocals on "Creeping Death" (Note: Producer Flemming Rasmussen posits that either Cliff Burton or Kirk Hammett was mouthing the "Die" chants and not actually singing.)
- Kirk Hammett – lead guitar, backing vocals on "Creeping Death"

Production

- Metallica – production
- Flemming Rasmussen – production assistant, engineering
- Mark Whitaker – production assistant, concert sound engineer, live production manager
- Tom Coyne – mastering on Megaforce release
- Tim Young – mastering on Music for Nations release
- Bob Ludwig – mastering on Elektra release
- George Marino – 1995 remastering
- Howie Weinberg – 2016 remastering

Packaging

- Metallica – cover concept
- AD Artists – cover design
- Fin Costello, Anthony D. Somella, Robert Hoetink – inner sleeve photos
- Pete Cronin, Rick Brackett, Harold Oimen – back cover photos

Digital re-release bonus tracks

- Jason Newsted – bass, backing vocals
- Mike Gillies – mixing

== Charts ==
=== Weekly charts ===
Chart (1984–2026)	Peak position
Australian Albums (ARIA)	38
Austrian Albums (Ö3 Austria)	49
Belgian Albums (Ultratop Flanders)	115
Belgian Albums (Ultratop Wallonia)	51
Canadian Metal Albums (Nielsen Soundscan)	33
Dutch Albums (Album Top 100)	20
Finnish Albums (Suomen virallinen lista)	9
French Albums (SNEP)	126
German Albums (Offizielle Top 100)	21
Hungarian Albums (MAHASZ)	39
Irish Albums (IRMA)	55
Italian Albums (FIMI)	66
Japanese Albums (Oricon)	99
New Zealand Albums (RMNZ)	32
Norwegian Albums (VG-lista)	40
Polish Albums (ZPAV)	4
Portuguese Albums (AFP)	35
Spanish Albums (Promusicae)	36
Swedish Albums (Sverigetopplistan)	31
Swiss Albums (Schweizer Hitparade)	35
UK Albums (OCC)	87
US Billboard 200	48
US Top Rock Albums (Billboard)	10

=== Year-end charts ===
Chart (2020)	Position
Polish Albums (ZPAV)	53
Chart (2021)	Position
Polish Albums (ZPAV)	59

== Certifications ==
Region	Certification	Certified units/sales
Australia (ARIA)	3× Platinum	210,000^{‡}
Canada (Music Canada)	Platinum	100,000^{^}
Denmark (IFPI Danmark)	2× Platinum	40,000^{‡}
Germany (BVMI)	Platinum	500,000^{‡}
Italy (FIMI) sales since 2009	Gold	25,000^{‡}
Poland (ZPAV)	Platinum	20,000^{‡}
United Kingdom (BPI)	Platinum	300,000^{‡}
United States (RIAA)	7× Platinum	7,000,000
^{^} Shipments figures based on certification alone.^{‡} Sales+streaming figures based on certification alone.

== Bibliography ==
- Clerc, Benoît (2023). Metallica All the Songs: The Story Behind Every Track. London: Cassell. ISBN 978-1-78472-893-9.
- Dome, Malcolm; Wall, Mick (2011). Metallica: The Music and the Mayhem. Omnibus Press. ISBN 978-0-85712-721-1.
- Gulla, Bob (2009). Guitar Gods: The 25 Players who Made Rock History. ABC-CLIO. ISBN 978-0-313-35806-7.
- Hadland, Sem (1998). Metallica: Fuel & Fire. Burlington, Ontario: Collector's Guide Publishing. ISBN 978-1-896522-09-8.
- Irwin, William (2009). Metallica and Philosophy: A Crash Course in Brain Surgery. John Wiley & Sons. ISBN 978-1-4051-6348-4.
- Kemp, Rob (2004). "Metallica". In Brackett, Nathan; Hoard, Christian David (eds.). The New Rolling Stone Album Guide. Simon & Schuster. ISBN 0-7432-0169-8.
- Larkin, Colin, ed. (2006). Encyclopedia of Popular Music. Vol. 5 (4th ed.). Oxford University Press. ISBN 0-19-531373-9.
- McIver, Joel (2009). To Live Is To Die: The Life and Death of Metallica's Cliff Burton. Omnibus Press. ISBN 978-1-906002-24-4.
- McIver, Joel (2014). Justice For All — The Truth About Metallica. Omnibus Press. ISBN 978-1-78323-123-2.
- Pillsbury, Glenn (2013). Damage Incorporated: Metallica and the Production of Musical Identity. Routledge. ISBN 978-0-415-97374-8.
- Popoff, Martin (2004). The Top 500 Heavy Metal Albums of All Time. ECW Press. ISBN 978-1-55022-600-3.
- Popoff, Martin (2005). The Collector's Guide to Heavy Metal: The Eighties. Vol. 2. Collector's Guide Publishing. ISBN 978-1-894959-31-5.
- Popoff, Martin (2013). Metallica: The Complete Illustrated History. Voyageur Press. ISBN 978-0-7603-4482-8.
- Prown, Pete; Newquist, Harvey P. (1997). Legends of Rock Guitar: The Essential Reference of Rock's Greatest Guitarists. Hal Leonard Corporation. ISBN 0-7935-4042-9.
- Winwood, Ian; Brannigan, Paul (2013). Birth School Metallica Death. Vol. 1. Faber & Faber. ISBN 978-0-571-29416-9.
