= Jump in the Fire =

Single by Metallica

from the album Kill 'Em All
- B-side: "Phantom Lord" (Live); "Seek & Destroy" (Live)
- Released: January 20, 1984
- Recorded: May 10–27, 1983
- Studio: Music America (Rochester, New York)
- Genre: Thrash metal
- Length: 4:40
- Label: Megaforce
- Songwriters: James Hetfield; Lars Ulrich; Dave Mustaine
- Producer: Paul Curcio

Metallica singles chronology
"Whiplash" (1983)	"Jump in the Fire" (1984)	"Creeping Death" (1984)

Audio sample
- Jump in the Fire: file; help

"Jump in the Fire" is a song by American heavy metal band Metallica. It was released as the second and final single from their debut album, Kill 'Em All. The single was accompanied by fake live performances of "Phantom Lord" and "Seek & Destroy" which were alternate studio recordings with sounds of a crowd overdubbed in.

"Jump in the Fire" is one of Metallica's earliest recorded songs, having been included on Ron McGovney's '82 Garage demo, an unreleased recording. The original lyrics and content, which dealt with sex, were written by Dave Mustaine in his former band Panic at the age of 16. The original version that Mustaine introduced to Hetfield and Ulrich upon joining Metallica was raw. The three worked together on refining the song and the outcome is what is heard on the demo. However, much like the events surrounding "The Four Horsemen", new lyrics were written by James Hetfield upon Mustaine's departure from Metallica. The new lyrics revolve around people being damned to Hell and therefore "jumping in the fire." Lars Ulrich claims that they had written the song to sound like "Run to the Hills" by Iron Maiden, which was popular at the time. However, Mustaine has since denied this claim. Current live performances since 2004 are in D standard tuning, as opposed to the E standard tuning of earlier live performances.

== Commemoration ==
The single sleeve artwork depicts a red-skinned demonic creature basking in flames. This artwork copies the Demon off the cover of Graham Masterton's 1978 novel, The Devils of D-Day (Sphere, 1979 edition), painted by Les Edwards. In 2009, a collectible action figure of this character was released by MediCom Toy Inc. With an original retail price of $99.99, the approximately 12-inch (30.48 cm) tall figure is limited to 1,000 pieces and sold as an online exclusive.

== Track listing ==
International single

No.	Title	Writer(s)	Length
1.	"Jump in the Fire"	James Hetfield; Lars Ulrich; Dave Mustaine	4:41
2.	"Seek and Destroy"	Hetfield; Ulrich	7:05
3.	"Phantom Lord"	Hetfield; Ulrich; Mustaine	4:52

== Personnel ==
Credits are adapted from Kill 'Em All liner notes.

- James Hetfield - rhythm guitar, vocals
- Kirk Hammett - lead guitar
- Cliff Burton - bass guitar
- Lars Ulrich - drums

== Charts ==
Chart (1990)	Peak position
New Zealand (Recorded Music NZ)	30
