= Through the Never =

Through The Never can refer to:

- Metallica: Through the Never, a 2013 Metallica concert film
- Metallica: Through the Never (album), the soundtrack album for the film
- "Through the Never", the seventh track on the 1991 Metallica album, Metallica
