= For Whom the Bell Tolls (Metallica song) =

Promotional single by Metallica

from the album Ride the Lightning
- Released: 1984
- Recorded: February 20 – March 14, 1984
- Studio: Sweet Silence (Copenhagen, Denmark)
- Genre: Thrash metal; heavy metal
- Length: 5:11 (album version); 3:59 (promo edit)
- Label: Elektra
- Songwriters: James Hetfield; Lars Ulrich; Cliff Burton
- Producers: Metallica; Flemming Rasmussen

Metallica singles chronology
"Creeping Death" (1984)	"For Whom the Bell Tolls" (1984)	"Master of Puppets" (1986)

Audio sample
- file; help

Live performance
- "For Whom the Bell Tolls" on YouTube

"For Whom the Bell Tolls" is a song by American heavy metal band Metallica. It was first released on their second studio album, Ride the Lightning (1984). Elektra Records also released it as a promotional single, with both edited and full-length versions. In March 2018 the song ranked number five on the band's live performance count. Several live albums and video albums include the song. In March 2023, Rolling Stone magazine ranked "For Whom the Bell Tolls" at number 39 on their "100 Greatest Heavy Metal Songs of All Time" list.

== Composition ==
"For Whom the Bell Tolls" is a thrash metal and heavy metal song, inspired by Ernest Hemingway's 1940 novel For Whom the Bell Tolls about the process of death in modern warfare and the bloody Spanish Civil War. Specific allusions are made to the scene described in Chapter 27 of the book, in which five soldiers are obliterated during an airstrike after taking a defensive position on a hill.

Cliff Burton plays the bass guitar introduction with heavy distortion and a wah pedal. There were three tracks of bass that he recorded, lead bass (distorted), bass (non-distorted), and harmonics over the lead. Burton wrote the intro before joining Metallica and first played it during a 12-minute jam at a battle of the bands with his second band Agents of Misfortune in 1979.

The bell sound heard at the beginning of the track was actually produced by drummer Lars Ulrich striking an anvil with a metal hammer in combination with a bell from a sound effects reel.

== Track listing ==
"For Whom the Bell Tolls" was released as a promo single with two versions of the song. An edited version appears on the A-side, with the full-length album version on the B-side.

Promotional 12-inch single
No.	Title	Length
1.	"For Whom the Bell Tolls" (edit)	3:59
2.	"For Whom the Bell Tolls"	5:11

== Other versions ==
=== Metallica ===
In 1999 and 2019, Metallica recorded "For Whom the Bell Tolls" with the San Francisco Symphony for the live albums S&M and S&M2, respectively. Other live versions appear on Cliff 'Em All (VHS, 1987), Live Shit: Binge & Purge (1993), Woodstock 94 (1994), Cunning Stunts (DVD, 1997), Français Pour une Nuit (DVD, 2009), Orgullo, Pasión, y Gloria: Tres Noches en la Ciudad de México (2009), The Big Four: Live from Sofia, Bulgaria (DVD, 2010), Quebec Magnetic (DVD, 2012), and Metallica: Through the Never (soundtrack, 2013).

=== Remixes ===
A remix by DJ Spooky appeared on the Spawn soundtrack, titled "For Whom the Bell Tolls (The Irony of it All)". Metallica later released it on "The Memory Remains" single, re-titled "For Whom the Bell Tolls (Haven't Heard It Yet Mix)". "The Irony of it All" has vocals from both the chorus and verses of the song, while "Haven't Heard It Yet Mix" only has vocals from the chorus. A Japanese-language version was produced for the Blue Eye Samurai soundtrack in 2023. This version features Emi Meyer as a vocalist.

== Personnel ==
Credits adapted from Ride The Lightning liner notes.

- James Hetfield – rhythm guitar, vocals
- Kirk Hammett – lead guitar
- Cliff Burton – bass
- Lars Ulrich – drums, anvil

== Charts ==
Chart (2019)	Peak position
US Hot Rock & Alternative Songs (Billboard)	18

Chart (2026)	Peak position
Greece International (IFPI)	14

== Certifications ==
Region	Certification	Certified units/sales
Australia (ARIA)	2× Platinum	140,000^{‡}
New Zealand (RMNZ)	2× Platinum	60,000^{‡}
United Kingdom (BPI)	Platinum	600,000^{‡}
United States (RIAA)	3× Platinum	3,000,000^{‡}
Streaming
Greece (IFPI Greece)	Gold	1,000,000^{†}
^{‡} Sales+streaming figures based on certification alone.^{†} Streaming-only figures based on certification alone.

== See also ==
- List of anti-war songs
