= Whiplash (Metallica song) =

Single by Metallica

from the album Kill 'Em All
- B-side: "Whiplash (Special Neckbrace Remix)"
- Released: August 8, 1983
- Recorded: May 10–27, 1983
- Studio: Music America Studios (Rochester, New York)
- Genre: Thrash metal; speed metal
- Length: 4:10
- Label: Megaforce
- Songwriters: James Hetfield; Lars Ulrich
- Producer: Paul Curcio

Metallica singles chronology
"Whiplash" (1983)	"Jump in the Fire" (1984)

Audio sample
- Whiplash: file; help

"Whiplash" is a song by American heavy metal band Metallica. It was released as the first single from their debut album, Kill 'Em All, and the band's debut single overall, released on August 8, 1983. The song has been covered a number of times, most notably by Motörhead, whose version won a Grammy Award for Best Metal Performance.

The single also includes fake live performances of "Seek & Destroy" and "Phantom Lord", which are actually alternate studio recordings with overdubbed crowd noise.

== Live performances ==
"Whiplash" was first played live in October 23, 1982, and was one of the last songs Metallica wrote for Kill 'Em All.

== Cover versions and appearances in media ==
- Motörhead (who have been cited by Metallica as a major influence) covered this song for the Metallica tribute album Metallic Attack: The Ultimate Tribute and won their first Grammy in the awards of 2005 in the Best Metal Performance category.
- Crematorium covered "Whiplash" on the album Overload: A Tribute to Metallica.
- The song was also covered by Billy Milano, Scott Ian, Philip Soussan, and Vinny Appice for Metallic Assault: A Tribute to Metallica.
- Pantera, using the joke name "Pantallica", performed the song live along with "Seek & Destroy" with Jason Newsted on bass, and members Dimebag Darrell (guitar) and Philip Anselmo (vocals) switching roles.
- Destruction covered "Whiplash" for a Metallica tribute album, and released it on some editions of their album All Hell Breaks Loose as a hidden bonus track.
- Stone Gods covered the song on their Knight of the Living Dead tour.
- "Whiplash" appears in the soundtrack for the video game Tony Hawk's Underground 2.
- "Whiplash" is a playable song in the video game Guitar Hero: Metallica.
- The song can be heard during a fight scene in the 2012 comedy film That's My Boy - starring Adam Sandler and Andy Samberg.
- According to Metallica guitarist Kirk Hammett in an interview, "Whiplash" was Kurt Cobain's favorite Metallica song.
- While not an official cover of the song itself, Corey Taylor and his band play the main riff of "Whiplash" as a finale to their cover of "Holier Than Thou" that featured on The Metallica Blacklist.

== Track listing ==
US single (vinyl)

No.	Title	Writer(s)	Length
1.	"Jump in the Fire"	James Hetfield; Lars Ulrich; Dave Mustaine	4:41
2.	"Whiplash (Special Neckbrace Remix)"	Hetfield; Ulrich	4:24
3.	"Seek & Destroy" (Live)	Hetfield; Ulrich	7:04
4.	"Phantom Lord" (Live)	Hetfield; Ulrich; Mustaine	4:52

US single (cassette maxi-single)

No.	Title	Writer(s)	Length
1.	"Jump in the Fire"	Hetfield; Ulrich; Mustaine	4:41
2.	"(Anesthesia) – Pulling Teeth" (instrumental)	Cliff Burton	4:15
3.	"Whiplash (Special Neckbrace Remix)"	Hetfield; Ulrich	4:24
4.	"Seek & Destroy" (Live)	Hetfield; Ulrich	7:04
5.	"Phantom Lord" (Live)	Hetfield; Ulrich; Mustaine	4:52

== Personnel ==
Credits are adapted from Kill 'Em All liner notes.

- James Hetfield – rhythm guitar, vocals
- Kirk Hammett – lead guitar
- Cliff Burton – bass
- Lars Ulrich – drums
