= (Anesthesia) – Pulling Teeth =

Instrumental by Metallica

from the album Kill 'Em All
- Released: July 25, 1983
- Recorded: May 1983
- Studio: Music America (Rochester, New York)
- Length: 4:14
- Label: Megaforce
- Songwriter: Cliff Burton (Uncredited)
- Producer: Paul Curcio

"(Anesthesia) – Pulling Teeth" is an instrumental track by American thrash metal band Metallica. It is the fifth track on their debut studio album, Kill 'Em All, released on July 25, 1983 through the independent label Megaforce Records. The song is an instrumental electric bass solo written and performed by Metallica bassist Cliff Burton, with drums performed by Lars Ulrich. A staple of Burton's live performances since his high school days in the band Agents of Misfortune, the instrumental track featured Burton's distinctive "lead-bass" style of playing, incorporating heavy distortion, use of wah-wah pedal and tapping.

"(Anesthesia) – Pulling Teeth" is the first instrumental recorded by Metallica, the first Metallica bass solo written by Burton. The track however is uncredited in the liner notes as they class it as a bass solo rather than a song.

== Background ==
In 1981 Cliff Burton was in a short-lived band called Agents of Misfortune, alongside fellow San Francisco Bay Area musician and future Faith No More guitarist Jim Martin. During this time the band participated in the Hayward Area Recreation Department's Battle of the Bands in 1981. Their audition for this show was recorded on video and features some of the earliest footage of Burton's innovative playing style. The video also shows Burton playing parts of what would soon be two Metallica songs: "(Anesthesia) - Pulling Teeth", and the chromatic intro to "For Whom the Bell Tolls". When Burton joined Metallica in 1983, he would start to incorporate these elements of lead-bass style of playing into their performances, and "(Anesthesia) – Pulling Teeth" would soon become a staple of their live shows throughout his tenure with the band.

Speaking on Burton's unique style and musical contributions to the band, James Hetfield told Bass Player magazine in January 2025, "Cliff always wanted to play more than he should have. He'd go up high on the neck a lot and the bottom would drop out, and certain notes always stood out more than others. But we didn't try to control him – we couldn't. We wanted him to figure out his place himself."

== Recording and composition ==
Cliff Burton primarily used a red Rickenbacker 4001 bass guitar for the recording of Kill 'Em All.

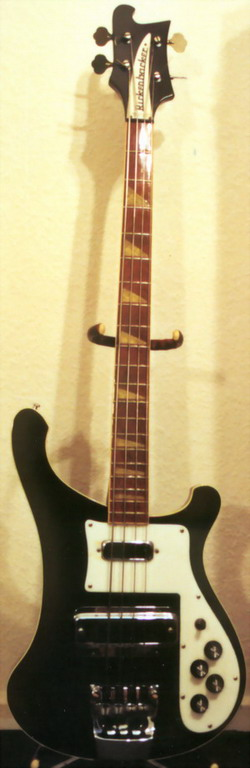
Rickenbacker 4001 bass, one of the models played by Burton

For the recording of "(Anesthesia) – Pulling Teeth", Cliff Burton insisted on recording alone in an empty room, while the studio technicians were downstairs. He made this recording in one take, after about twenty minutes of preparation. According to Metallica guitarist Kirk Hammett in an interview with Metal Hammer, "I remember him recording his bass solo separately from anyone or anything. He was upstairs in this big empty room, standing there alone, just him and his bass amp. I watched him play while they were getting his sound right downstairs in the control room. After 15 or 20 minutes, he got the sound right and then he looked at me and said: 'Get away from me, man — I'm about to do this.' And then he took a hit off a joint, bent over and drank a beer, and I hightailed it out of there."

The song displayed Burton's unique use of effect pedals, such as a wah-wah pedal and Electro Harmonix Big Muff, as well as extremely heavy distortion, all of which were ‍not commonly used by ‍bassists in such capacity. At the beginning of the song, studio engineer Chris Bubacz introduces the track as "Bass solo, take one", informing listeners that the song was recorded in one take. The first half of the song displays Burton's affinity for classical music, using Bach-inspired arpeggios. About halfway through the track after a momentary pause, drummer Lars Ulrich joins with an accompanying drumbeat, which then segues the song into a much heavier, freestyle-inspired finale by Burton.

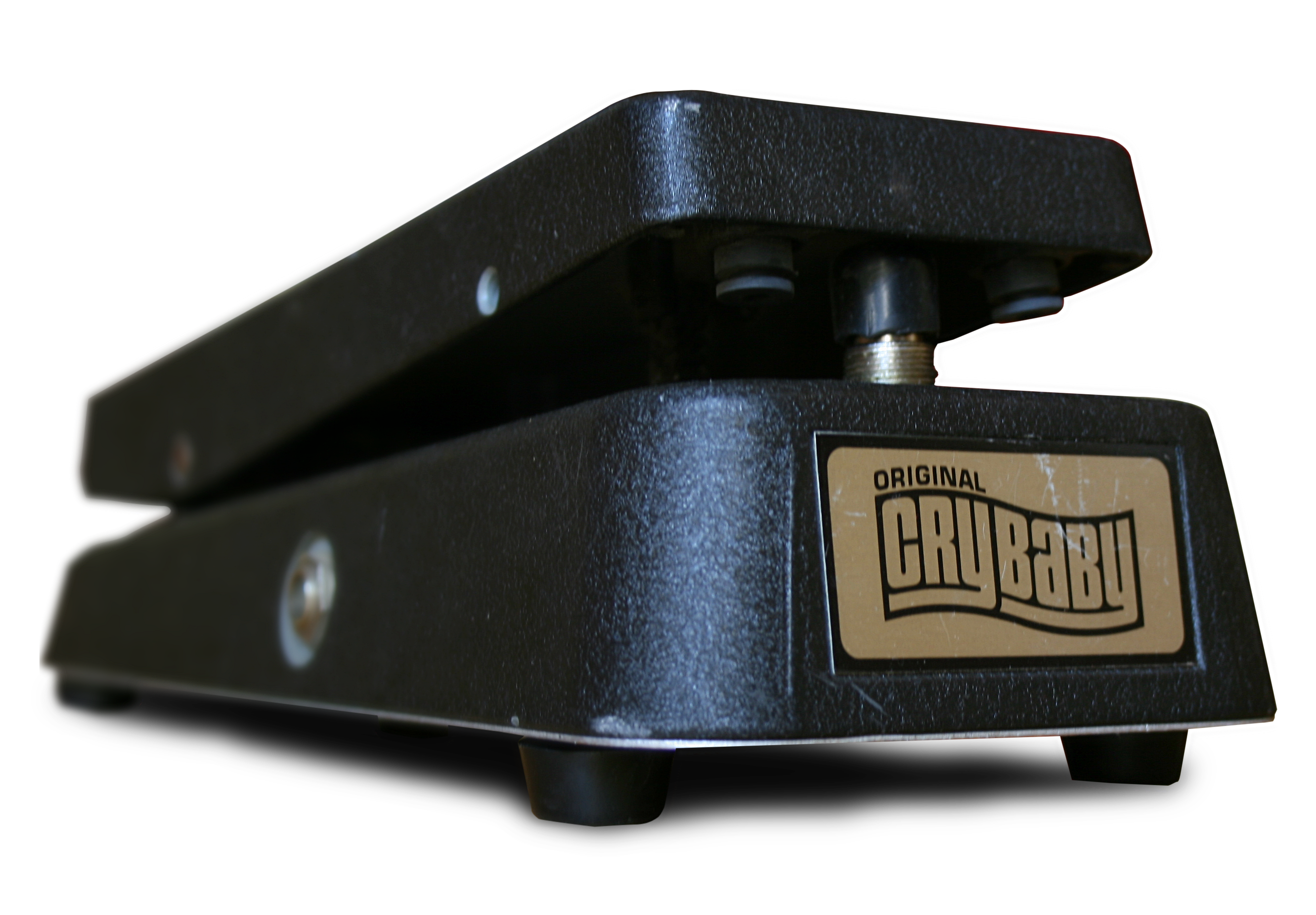
Wah-wah crybaby pedal, one of the many effects pedals used by Cliff Burton

== Reception and legacy ==
Widely considered to be Burton's signature song, "(Anesthesia) – Pulling Teeth" is credited as revolutionizing the electric bass guitar. The song has been praised for its technical proficiency, melodic phrasing, and as an early example of the bass being used as a lead instrument in heavy metal. This helped to raise the profile of the bass guitar and inspire a new generation of players. The song continues to be a benchmark for bass solos and a source of inspiration for musicians on many levels. It's considered one of the most iconic bass solos in metal history and is still studied and analyzed by bass players.

When Metallica were inducted into the Rock and Roll Hall of Fame in 2009, Red Hot Chili Peppers bassist Flea delivered the induction speech for Metallica and praised Cliff Burton's contributions to the band's legacy, and singled out "(Anesthesia) Pulling Teeth", saying "That song is one of the great moments in rock history for the electric bass guitar. It's a beautiful piece of music."

In December 2011, Metallica played a series of shows at The Fillmore in San Francisco celebrating the 30th anniversary of the formation of the band. During this series of shows, they performed "(Anesthesia) – Pulling Teeth" for the first time since Cliff Burton's death in 1986, with Robert Trujillo performing the song. The song has rarely been performed live since. One occasion most notably was at the Orion Music + More Festival in 2013, which marked the 30th anniversary of the release of Kill 'Em All. Metallica performed the album in its entirety in a surprise appearance at the festival, with Robert Trujillo using the Cliff Burton Aria Pro II signature bass for his performance of "(Anesthesia) – Pulling Teeth" while Cliff's father Ray Burton watched from the side of the stage.

To mark the 30th anniversary of Kill 'Em All July 2013, VH1 conducted a series of interviews with fellow musicians and fans of Metallica reflecting on the album's influence. Jason Newsted, who replaced Cliff Burton as bass player of Metallica after his death, spoke on the album and Burton's impact: "'Whiplash' and 'Anesthesia' are timeless masterpieces in my opinion. 'Whiplash' for its raw appeal and Cliff opening up the sky for young aspiring bassists to venture out past the edges of where bass lived previously with 'Anesthesia.'" In the same series of interviews for VH1, Dream Theater drummer Mike Portnoy said he considers the song a highlight of the album. Portnoy remarked, "At the time, I was all about the songs, especially 'The Four Horsemen,' but now that I've heard them so many times I find my favorite part of the album is Cliff's bass solo. It shows what a virtuoso and how unbelievably original he was. I mean, a bass solo on a debut studio album, who does that?"

In September 2019, Metallica recorded their live album S&M2 at the Chase Center in San Francisco, which was a live collaboration by the band and the San Francisco Symphony. Bassist Scott Pingel performed a live rendition of "(Anesthesia) – Pulling Teeth", along with Lars Ulrich on drums, as a tribute to the late Cliff Burton.

A Metallica tribute album was released in 2025 titled No Life 'Til Leather - A Tribute To Metallica's Kill 'Em All. David Ellefson, former bass player and co-founder of rival thrash metal band Megadeth, recorded a cover of “(Anesthesia) – Pulling Teeth” for the album. In a statement made with Loudwire to promote the compilation, Ellefson said, "It was a total honor to be asked to participate in this album, especially to record the iconic bass composition '(Anesthesia) - Pulling Teeth' by the one and only Cliff Burton… It is my hope that this homage will highlight Cliff's larger-than-life personality and that his music will always live on through this unique and iconic song he gave to the world." Ellefson also said he was able to borrow one of Cliff's Aria Pro signature bass guitars and signature Morley fuzz/wah pedal for the session to replicate his sharp-yet-thunderous tone Cliff created on the original recording.

== Accolades ==
"(Anesthesia) – Pulling Teeth" has received numerous accolades since its release and is widely recognized as a standout piece in the band's discography and in the broader metal genre. It was ranked as the 49th greatest Metallica song according to Spin magazine, the 40th greatest Metallica song according to Rolling Stone, and the 31st greatest Metallica song according to Loudwire. In 2022 Louder published a list of the Top 10 Metallica Songs That Showcase the Genius of Cliff Burton, with “(Anesthesia)–Pulling Teeth” ranking number one, ahead of “Orion”, “For Whom the Bell Tolls”, and “Creeping Death”.

In 2014 VH1 published a list of the greatest bass solos off all time, and "(Anesthesia) – Pulling Teeth" was ranked second, only behind John Entwistle‘s performance on “My Generation” by The Who. Heavy metal/hard rock website Loudwire ranked "(Anesthesia) – Pulling Teeth" number one on their list of the greatest heavy metal bass solos of all time, and in 2024 Guitar World also ranked the song number one on their list of greatest bass solos of all time.

== Personnel ==
- Cliff Burton – bass guitar
- Lars Ulrich – drums
- Chris Bubacz – introduction

=== Production ===
- Paul Curcio – production
- Jon Zazula – executive producer
- Chris Bubacz – engineer
- Andy Wroblewski – assistant engineer
- Jack Skinner – mastering
