= Morley Pedals =

Guitar pedals company

- Type: Private
- Industry: Musical Instruments
- Founded: 1969; 57 years ago
- Founder: Raymond and Marvin Lubow
- Headquarters: Carpentersville, IL, United States
- Products: Effects pedals
- Website: Official website

Morley Pedals is the name of a guitar effects pedal company, famous for manufacturing wah-wah pedals and other treadle type effects for guitar. Morley pedals use electro-optical circuitry rather than a potentiometer to control the effect. The foot treadle controls a shutter inside the pedal that in turn controls the amount of light reaching a photoresistor. The advantage to this system is that there are no potentiometers in the signal path to wear out and become "scratchy sounding" over time. Electro-optical circuitry is used throughout the classic Morley pedal line, which includes or has included volume pedals, delay pedals, chorus and phaser pedals, and many others.

== History ==
The Morley company was started by two brothers, Raymond (died June 18, 2002, Los Angeles) and Marvin Lubow (December 13, 1924 – June 2, 2010, Nine Mile Falls, Spokane County) in Los Angeles in the 1960s. Raymond designed a device that is usually referred to as an "oil can delay": an electro-mechanical unit that used a rotating disc coated with electrostatic fluid inside a small metal can. This echo unit made it possible for musical performers to re-create echo effects in a live performance without using echo chambers or unreliable tape devices. The Lubow brothers went into business as Tel-Ray Electronics, manufacturing their new Adineko echo device for many companies including Fender and Gibson. Raymond also designed another device that simulated the sound of a Leslie rotating speaker cabinet in use by organists and other musicians. This device also used the rotating-disc/oil-can method. The Lubow brothers jokingly referred to this new invention as a "Morley" ("More-Lee" as opposed to "Less-Lee").

Shortly thereafter, Tel-Ray shifted their emphasis away from OEM manufacturing and began marketing their own line of pedals under the Morley name. A new treadle and case design consisting of a rather large and industrial-looking chrome-plated housing and rubber-covered treadle was used universally throughout the entire Morley line, which included volume pedals, wah pedals, a rotating sound pedal (the original "Morley"), and a pedal version of their echo device dubbed the Morley EVO-1.

The large chrome plated housing was used through the 1970s as the Morley line grew to include all kinds of effects, including distortion units, flangers, phasers, and some unique devices such as the PKW "Pik-A-Wah" pedal. Morley produced many multi-function pedals such as the PFV "Phaser Volume", the ECV "Echo Chorus Vibrato", the WVO "Wah Volume", the CFL "Chorus Flanger", and the PWF "Power Wah Fuzz".

Morley pedals became known for their rugged construction and overall design. Morley pedals from the 1970s were also AC powered using a standard AC type power cord. Even in the modern day, Morley pedals manufactured during the Tel-Ray/Lubow Brothers period are highly looked at by collectors. When, in the early sixties, Cliff Richard's backing band "The Shadows" became instrumental hit-makers, their then-innovative sound was partly owing to lead guitar player Hank Marvin’s Morley echo unit.

In the 1980s Morley reduced the housing and treadle size of their pedals significantly and eventually changed the chassis to black. 9VDC battery power with an AC adapter jack (wall-wart jack) became standard as Morley pedals evolved in an effort to compete with the new compact pedals from companies like Boss, Ibanez, and DOD. Morley also manufactured some small non-treadle style effects for a while.

Morley was sold to a Chicago based firm, Sound Enhancements, Inc., in 1989. The modern Morley company continues to use the electro-optical circuitry and basic pedal layout pioneered by Raymond and Marvin Lubow in the 1960s, albeit with some refinements. Original Morley pedals were strictly AC powered, whereas the current models are powered by a 9V battery with AC adapter capability. Tel-Ray Morleys used a small light-bulb to illuminate the photoresistor; modern Morleys use LEDs.

Although there is no direct connection between the new Morley company and the now defunct Tel-Ray company, Morley continues to provide documentation for the old product line (Owner's Manuals and schematics) through their website. Light bulbs and some parts for the old Tel-Ray pedals are still available through Morley.

== Sound Enhancement Products ==
The Reverb product line evolved from the Hammond Organ Company, where the Reverb was originally used in organs. The company later began marketing the unit to amplifier manufacturers. In 1962, Leo Fender, introduced what was then called the "Hammond Reverb", in Fender's, now legendary, "Twin Reverb" amp. This established reverb in guitar amps from that time forward. In 1971, Hammond Organ moved Reverb production to its Accutronics division located in Geneva IL. Slowly the "Hammond Reverb" became known as the "Accutronics Reverb".

In 1977, Accutronics became a member of the Marmon Group of companies. In 1982 all of Accutronics divisions were consolidated into one building located in Cary, IL. In 1986 the company acquired OC Electronics, thus becoming the only domestic manufacturer of Reverb units. In 1989, the company acquired the "Morley" trade name from Tel-Ray Electronics in North Hollywood, CA. In January 1990, Accutronics, Inc. moved its Reverb and Morley divisions into a separate facility in Cary, IL.

In May 1991, the Reverb and Morley divisions of Accutronics were incorporated into the entity, Sound Enhancements, Inc. In 1999, Sound Enhancements became a member of the Stainless Industrial Company. In 2001, Sound Enhancements, Inc. acquired Ebtech. As of August 2005, the company name was changed to Sound Enhancement Products, Inc and is currently an independently owned company.

Sound Enhancement Products, Inc. (SEPI) manufactures O.E.M. electro-mechanical spring reverberation devices, primarily sold to guitar amplifier manufacturers. Commonly called "reverb units", these devices are sold under the "Accutronics" trade name. Reverb units provide electronic reverberation in an amplifier to produce a sound that is more natural to the human ear.

SEPI also, manufactures foot-controlled pedals, effect boxes and footswitches that alter, enhance and/or control sounds created from an electronic musical instrument, primarily an electric guitar. These devices are sold under the "Morley" trade name. As of December 10, 2001, SEPI also manufactures audio solution devices sold under the "Ebtech" trade name. As of March 2007, SEPI also distributes Pedal Pad Brand products for MKS Profession Stage Products.

== Endorsements ==
The modern Morley company has continued to release new models to this day. Many modern artists endorse and use their pedals. Artists known to use them include Steve Vai, who has a signature model: the Bad Horsie. Adam Darski (Nergal) from Behemoth and Mark Tremonti are also notable Morley artists; the latter has a signature wah-wah pedal. In addition, Metallica's early bass player, Cliff Burton, used an original Tel-Rey 'chrome' Morley Wah Boost along with an Ibanez Tube Screamer overdrive unit. It was similar to the company's current Morley Power Wah model.
