= Seek & Destroy =

1983 song by Metallica

Song by Metallica

from the album Kill 'Em All
- Released: July 25, 1983
- Recorded: May 10–27, 1983
- Studio: Music America (Rochester, New York)
- Length: 6:54
- Label: Megaforce
- Songwriters: James Hetfield; Lars Ulrich
- Producer: Paul Curcio

"Seek & Destroy" is a song by the American heavy metal band Metallica and the ninth track from their debut studio album, Kill 'Em All (1983). It was also featured on the demo No Life 'Til Leather. It was the first song the band recorded in a studio. "Seek & Destroy" has been frequently performed at the group's concerts since its live debut in 1982 and had been Metallica's closing song from the Madly in Anger with the World Tour to the Metallica By Request Tour. It is the third-most performed song in the band's history, having been played 1,610 times as of October 2024, behind only "Creeping Death" (1,637) and "Master of Puppets" (1,757).

During the 2004 documentary film about Metallica, Metallica: Some Kind of Monster, the song is used when footage of the band down the years is shown highlighting the progression in the group's appearance and sound over time. In AOL Radio's list of the 10 Best Metallica Songs, "Seek & Destroy" was ranked at number 4, and Allmusic's Steve Huey chose the song as an AMG Track Pick from Kill 'Em All.

Following the terrorist attacks on September 11, 2001, the song was placed on the list of post-9/11 inappropriate titles distributed by Clear Channel.

== Writing and inspiration ==
The song is about feeling the urge to kill, but not literally doing it. During the Kill 'Em All for One Tour, Hetfield would jokingly say that it was about hunting. It is said to be heavily influenced by the Diamond Head song "Dead Reckoning". The first three mini-solos are derived from the song "Princess of the Night" by Saxon. Metallica added the final solo. Since the song's debut on Kill 'Em All, Hammett has apologized for the unusual pitch of the string bend which occurs at 3:47 to 3:48, during the solo. It is, in fact, a mistake or "bum note".

If 'Seek And Destroy' is borrowed from any Diamond Head song, it's 'Dead Reckoning'. It greatly inspired 'Seek And Destroy', shall we say.

— Lars Ulrich, June 1993

== Live performance ==
The song has become a fan favorite and has been played at virtually every Metallica concert since the band's inception. It is usually played as a closing number for its live performances since the Madly in Anger with the World tour, with Hetfield often asking the audience to sing along with him; he shouts "Searching," and they shout "Seek and destroy!" During the Wherever We May Roam Tour, "Seek & Destroy" was played with Jason Newsted singing vocals; however, at the end of the song, the band would commence in a jam for nearly seven minutes until Hetfield took the microphone and continually had the audience sing the lines "Seek and destroy!". He also went to the edge of the barriers holding off the crowd and got them to sing the lines individually. The song length went from an average of seven minutes to an average of 16 to 20 minutes for the elongated concert version of the Black Album tour.

During the Shit Hits the Sheds Tour in 1994, the song was introduced as a new song that Newsted wrote and included an extended jam which also featured one of the main riffs of "The Outlaw Torn". From 2004 to 2015, it became a regular closing song at the end of the band's set. From 1983 to 1994, the song was played in E standard tuning. From 1995 to 2000 and for two shows in 2002 and 2013, respectively, it was played in E flat tuning. It was played in D standard tuning from 2000 to 2015. Starting again in 2015, it was played in E flat tuning. When played live, Hetfield (in the past also Newsted) often changes the beginning lyrics "in the city tonight" by replacing "the city" with the name of the town in which they are performing.

Since 2004, bassist Robert Trujillo has done a spinning technique with his bass guitar after the guitar solo of the song before the last verse.

Notably, Seek & Destroy was the last song ever played at Nürburgring before the location of the Rock am Ring festival was moved elsewhere.

A performance of the song with Burton on bass in 1985, is available on the DVD Cliff 'Em All. Newer live versions can also be found in the Live Shit: Binge & Purge box set (with Newsted singing the lead vocals on the Mexico City CDs and the San Diego DVD) and the Cunning Stunts DVD when played in the Kill/Ride Medley.

== Personnel ==
Credits are adapted from Kill 'Em All liner notes.

- James Hetfield – rhythm guitar, vocals
- Kirk Hammett – lead guitar
- Cliff Burton – bass
- Lars Ulrich – drums

== Charts ==
Chart (2026)	Peak position
Greece International (IFPI)	52

== Certifications ==
Region	Certification	Certified units/sales
Australia (ARIA)	Gold	35,000^{‡}
New Zealand (RMNZ)	Gold	15,000^{‡}
United Kingdom (BPI)	Silver	200,000^{‡}
United States (RIAA)	Platinum	1,000,000^{‡}
Streaming
Greece (IFPI Greece)	Gold	1,000,000^{†}
^{‡} Sales+streaming figures based on certification alone.^{†} Streaming-only figures based on certification alone.

== Use in sports ==
The song was also the theme song of former WCW, TNA, WWE, and AEW retired wrestler Sting and former AAA wrestler Cibernético. In Sting's case, the song was a live recording from Woodstock '99 which would be included on the 1999 compilation WCW Mayhem: The Music. Sting used the song for two of his All Elite Wrestling career matches at All In London at Wembley Stadium and his retirement match at Revolution 2024.

Since 2013, the San Jose Sharks of the National Hockey League have used "Seek & Destroy" as their entrance theme, as many of the band members are Sharks fans.

The Pittsburgh Penguins, St. Louis Blues, Edmonton Oilers and the New Jersey Devils of the National Hockey League also use the song as their entrance theme during home games.

As of 2010, it is being used as the home theme song for the Australian rugby league team, the Canterbury-Bankstown Bulldogs. In attempt to end his batting slump, White Sox baseman Gordon Beckham began using "Seek & Destroy" as his introduction theme in May 2010, replacing The Outfield's "Your Love". Zoic Studios created a television commercial for NASCAR that features "Seek & Destroy." It aired in May 2010.

== Use in other media ==
The song is one of three Metallica tracks selected for the fictional heavy metal radio station "The Chamber 106.6" of the 2026 video game Grand Theft Auto VI.

== Bibliography ==
- Malcolm Dome; Mick Wall (1996). The complete guide to the music of Metallica. Omnibus Press. ISBN 978-0-7119-4902-7.
