= William Irwin (philosopher) =

- Born: 1970 (age 55–56)
- Education: Fordham University (BA); University at Buffalo (PhD)

William Irwin (born 1970) is Professor of Philosophy at King's College in Wilkes-Barre, Pennsylvania and is best known for originating the "philosophy and popular culture" book genre with Seinfeld and Philosophy: A Book about Everything and Nothing in 1999 and The Simpsons and Philosophy: The D'oh! of Homer in 2001.

== Early life ==
Irwin was born in 1970 and raised in Yonkers, New York. He attended Regis High School in Manhattan, a Jesuit institution, graduating in 1988. He received his BA in Philosophy from Fordham University in 1992 where he graduated Phi Beta Kappa and Summa cum Laude, having attended Fordham on a full Presidential Scholarship. He later received his PhD in Philosophy from the University at Buffalo in 1996 at the age of 26. Irwin’s dissertation, “Harmonizing Hermeneutics: The Normative and Descriptive Approaches, Interpretation and Criticism,” was awarded the Perry Prize for Outstanding Dissertations in Philosophy. His dissertation director was Jorge J.E. Gracia. E.D. Hirsch, Jr. was his external evaluator.

== Contributions to philosophy ==
Irwin is the author of God Is a Question, Not an Answer: Finding Common Ground in Our Uncertainty, published by Rowman & Littlefield.

The Free Market Existentialist: Capitalism without Consumerism was published by Wiley-Blackwell in 2015. Michael Shermer, the editor of Skeptic magazine, praised the book, saying “William Irwin has transcended ideology and tribalism to unite a set of ideas that, for the first time, could end the rancor between the Left and the Right by reminding each of their shared values. This book will change the thinking of everyone interested in politics, economics, or religion—a game changing work.”

Irwin’s first book, Intentionalist Interpretation: A Philosophical Explanation and Defense, was nominated for the American Philosophical Association Young Scholar’s Book Prize and was the subject of a special book session at the annual meeting of the Canadian Society for Hermeneutics and Postmodern Thought in May 2000.

Irwin's creative writing includes two poetry books, Both/And and Always Dao, and two novels, Free Dakota and Little Siddhartha, a sequel to Hermann Hesse's novel Siddhartha.

Irwin has published articles in scholarly journals such as Philosophy and Literature, Philosophy Today, Journal of Value Inquiry, and The Journal of Aesthetics and Art Criticism.

Irwin is best known for having originated the philosophy and popular culture genre of books with Seinfeld and Philosophy: A Book about Everything and Nothing in 1999 and then the popular The Simpsons and Philosophy in 2001. He was editor of these books and then series editor of the Popular Culture and Philosophy Series through Open Court Publishing Company, producing titles such as Harry Potter and Philosophy: If Aristotle Ran Hogwarts, Star Wars and Philosophy: More Powerful Than You Can Possibly Imagine, Superheroes and Philosophy: Truth, Justice, and the Socratic Way, and many others. Carlin Romano from The Chronicle of Higher Education called the Popular Culture and Philosophy Series “the most serious philosophy series on the market, if some link between academic seriousness and real life still exists.” In an article in the Chronicle of Higher Education, Stephen T. Asma called William Irwin the “chief architect” of the philosophy and popular culture movement.

In 2006, Irwin left Open Court to become the General Editor of The Blackwell Philosophy and Pop Culture Series through Wiley-Blackwell. Reuters (now Thomson Reuters) reported that Irwin’s books have sold more than one million copies. South Park and Philosophy: You Know, I Learned Something Today was the first in that series, published in 2006. Metallica and Philosophy: A Crash Course in Brain Surgery followed shortly thereafter; Scott Ian from Anthrax called it “a kick-ass read.” The series also includes Black Sabbath and Philosophy: Mastering Reality published in 2012. Irwin is quoted in USA Today as claiming that "the books are about smart popular culture for smart fans.”

Irwin first theorized the philosophy and pop culture genre in his article “Philosophy as/and/of Popular Culture” in Irwin and Gracia eds. Philosophy and the Interpretation of Popular Culture (Lanham, MD: Rowman & Littlefield, 2006), pp. 41–63. In 2010 he explained the motivation for the series and defended it against critics in an article in The Philosophers’ Magazine titled “Fancy Taking a Pop?” Irwin defended the style of the books in “Writing for the Reader: A Defense of Philosophy and Popular Culture Books”.

When Irwin was with Open Court, he edited The Matrix and Philosophy: Welcome to the Desert of the Real, which Anderson Cooper referred to as an "interesting collection of thoughts on the movie and its place in the world" in an interview with Irwin. Irwin also discussed a follow-up book, More Matrix and Philosophy: Revolutions and Reloaded Decoded, in an interview with Keith Olbermann.

Irwin is the author of the first book exclusively focused on the lyrics of James Hetfield, The Meaning of Metallica: Ride the Lyrics.

Irwin has appeared as a guest on hundreds of radio shows, television shows, and podcasts. He has been interviewed by Time, The New York Times, the Los Angeles Times, The Chronicle of Higher Education, USA Today, the BBC, CNN, NPR, and MSNBC, among others. In a 2010 interview with Time, Irwin said “Philosophy has had a bad rap for centuries. People mistakenly think it has nothing to do with their everyday lives, including enjoying media.” Concerning readers’ reaction to the book series, Irwin told The Wall Street Journal, "I think an equal amount of people find it either too fluffy or too rigorous."

In May 2012 Irwin was named Outstanding Alumnus by the Philosophy Department at the University at Buffalo, The State University of New York. He is the first person to receive this award.

Along with David Kyle Johnson, Irwin writes the blog "Plato on Pop" for Psychology Today.

He also maintains the blog “It’s Your Choice: The Free Market Existentialist Perspective” for Psychology Today.

== Editorial activities ==
Series Editor, The Blackwell Philosophy and Pop Culture Series (Wiley-Blackwell) Series Editor, Popular Culture and Philosophy (Open Court Publishing).

== Bibliography ==
=== Books authored ===
- God Is a Question, Not an Answer: Finding Common Ground in Our Uncertainty (Lanham, MD: Rowman & Littlefield, 2019).
- Little Siddhartha: A Sequel (Brunswick, Maine: Shanti Arts Publishing, 2018).
- Free Dakota (Roundfire Books, 2016).
- The Free Market Existentialist: Capitalism without Consumerism (Oxford: Wiley-Blackwell, 2015)
- Intentionalist Interpretation: A Philosophical Explanation and Defense (Westport, CT: Greenwood Press, December 1999). Nominated for the American Philosophical Association Young Scholar's Book Prize.
- Critical Thinking: A Student's Introduction (with G. Bassham, H. Nardone, and J. Wallace), ( New York : McGraw-Hill, 2001; 2nd Edition 2004; 3rd Edition 2007).
- Both/And (Wilmington, NC: Wisdom/Work, 2021).
- Always Dao (Brunswick, Maine: Shanti Arts Publishing, 2021).
- The Meaning of Metallica: Ride the Lyrics (Toronto: ECW, 2022).

=== Books edited ===
- The Philosophical Legacy of Jorge J.E. Gracia (co-edited with Robert Delfino and Jonathan J. Sanford) (Lanham, MD: Rowman & Littlefield, 2022).
- The Death and Resurrection of the Author? (Westport, CT: Greenwood Press, 2002).
- Philosophy and the Interpretation of Pop Culture (co-edited with Jorge J.E. Gracia) (Lanham, MD: Rowman & Littlefield, 2007).
- Black Sabbath and Philosophy: Mastering Reality (Malden, MA: Blackwell Publishing, 2012).
- Metallica and Philosophy: A Crash Course in Brain Surgery (Malden, MA: Blackwell Publishing, 2007). Translated into German, Hungarian, Italian, and Portuguese.
- More Matrix and Philosophy: Revolutions and Reloaded Decoded (Chicago: Open Court, 2005).
- The Matrix and Philosophy: Welcome to the Desert of the Real (Chicago: Open Court, 2002). New York Times bestseller. Translated into Japanese, Portuguese, Hungarian, Italian, Russian, Hebrew, and Turkish.
- The Simpsons and Philosophy: The D’oh! of Homer (with M. Conard and A. Skoble) (Chicago: Open Court, 2001). *#2 on Amazon.com’s list of Best Philosophy Books of 2001. New York Times backlist bestseller. Translated into Italian, Japanese, Korean, Turkish, German, Russian, Hebrew, and Portuguese.
- Seinfeld and Philosophy: A Book about Everything and Nothing (Chicago: Open Court, 2000). Translated into Turkish, Hebrew, Serbian, Croatian, and Portuguese.
