= Bob Gulla =

American music historian

Bob Gulla is an American music historian and musicologist, music encyclopedia author, and biographer and writer. He has authored books such as Icons of R&B and Soul: An Encyclopedia of the Artists Who Revolutionized Rhythm, Guitar Gods: The 25 Players Who Made Rock History, and has co-written The Greenwood Encyclopedia of Rock History and Piano Love Songs for Dummies, Movie Piano Songs for Dummies and Christmas Piano Songs for Dummies. In his book Icons of R&B and Soul he wrote biographical pieces on artists including Ray Charles, Little Richard, Fats Domino, Ruth Brown, LaVern Baker, Sam Cooke, Jackie Wilson, Etta James, Ike Turner, Tina Turner, The Isley Brothers, James Brown, and Otis Redding. In Volume 6 of The Greenwood Encyclopedia of Rock History, The Grunge and Post-Grunge Years, 1991–2005, Gulla is described as "capturing the many innovations of millennial rock music and culture." He was also a contributing music writer for The Phoenix(now defunct).
