= Creeping Death =

1984 single by Metallica

Single by Metallica

from the album Ride the Lightning
- B-side: "Am I Evil?"; "Blitzkrieg"
- Released: November 23, 1984
- Recorded: February–March 1984
- Studio: Sweet Silence (Copenhagen)
- Genre: Thrash metal
- Length: 6:36
- Label: Megaforce; Elektra
- Songwriters: James Hetfield; Lars Ulrich; Cliff Burton; Kirk Hammett
- Producers: Flemming Rasmussen; Metallica

Metallica singles chronology
"Jump in the Fire" (1984)	"Creeping Death" (1984)	"Master of Puppets" (1986)

Audio sample
- Creeping Death: file; help

"Creeping Death" is a song by American heavy metal band Metallica. It was released on November 23, 1984, as the lead and only commercial single from their album Ride the Lightning ("Fade to Black" and "For Whom the Bell Tolls", from the same album, were issued as promotional singles). Written from the perspective of the Angel of Death, "Creeping Death" describes the tenth plague of Egypt. It is often thought of as one of the band’s most popular songs and is currently the second-most-played song live by them.

== Development ==
Lars Ulrich and James Hetfield got the idea for the song's lyrics by watching the film The Ten Commandments, which is based on the Biblical story of the Plagues of Egypt. The two founding members loved the film and used to watch it at Cliff Burton's house, as his parents owned a VCR, a rare piece of equipment in the early 1980s. While watching the scene of the final plague (about 2 hours 49 minutes into the movie), represented by a green fog appearing out of the moon and rolling across the ground, killing every Egyptian first-born child that got caught in it, Burton remarked; "Whoa, that's like creeping death!", to which Hetfield responded; "Whoa, man, write that down, sheer poetry!" The band liked the sound of the phrase Burton coined and decided to write a song about the plagues, using it as its title.

Much like "Trapped Under Ice", which borrowed its riff from "Impaler" by Kirk Hammett's former band Exodus, the "Die by my hand" section of "Creeping Death" was constructed around the riff from "Die By His Hand". "I recall calling Kirk up and giving him a great deal of grief," Exodus guitarist Gary Holt later grumbled. "He said, 'Ah, I thought I asked you if it was ok.' I'm like, 'No, you didn't.' So I've had the pleasure -- and I use the term loosely -- of watching 60,000 people chant 'Die by my hand!' at Metallica shows, yet I've never received a penny for it." In his defense, Hammett said that the riff was his creation, and that he wrote it when he was 16.

The single release's artwork was done by Alvin Petty. The logo and the song's title were added with a plastic layover to the existing artwork. Kirk Hammett had seen the picture hanging up at Petty's house and remarked that it would be perfect for the single and picture-disk that were about to be finished.

== Lyrics ==
For how the idea for the song's lyrics were acquired, see Development.

The song is told from the perspective of the "Destroyer", the Angel of Death sent by God during the Tenth Plague of Egypt. Moses, through his older brother Aaron, insisted he was sent by God and repeatedly demanded that Pharaoh should set the Hebrew slaves free from Egypt to the promised land of Canaan. For the previous 400 years, the Hebrew people had lived as slaves in the Land of Goshen within Egypt. The Pharaoh refused, and for his obstinacy, God set ten plagues upon Egypt. The references to the plagues/the book of exodus in the song include:

"So let it be written, so let it be done"	since the idea for the song's lyrics came from the aforementioned The Ten Commandments movie, this line, which is spoken in the movie, was incorporated into the song's chorus to pay tribute
"To kill the first-born Pharaoh's son"	The tenth and final plague of Egypt, during which the firstborn son of every non-Israelite, including the Pharaoh's son, is killed by the "Destroyer". This was done in response to the Pharaoh's order to throw every Israelite baby boy into the Nile River.
"Let my people go"	Moses demanding the Pharaoh to free the Hebrews from slavery.
"I will be with thee, bush of fire"	Moses first met God in the form of a burning bush, who told him to lead the Hebrews out of slavery.
"Blood, Running red and strong, down the Nile"	The first plague of Egypt, during which the water in the Nile River turned to blood.
"Plague!"	A reference to any of the Ten Plagues.
"Darkness three days long"	The ninth plague of Egypt, during which the sun was blotted out for three days and darkness fell over all of Egypt.
"Hail to fire"	The seventh plague of Egypt, during which burning hail rained from the skies over Egypt.
"Blood, lamb's blood painted door; I shall pass"	A reference to the forewarning given to the Israelites by God before the final plague; the Israelites were commanded to paint their doors with lamb's blood so that the Angel of Death would know that they were Israelites and not kill their firstborns while instead targeting the Egyptian firstborns. The Jewish holiday Passover is celebrated to commemorate the "passing over" of the Angel of Death.

== Release ==
The single was released through Music for Nations in the UK and France. The B-sides were the cover songs "Am I Evil?" (originally by Diamond Head) and "Blitzkrieg" (originally by Blitzkrieg). These covers are called Garage Days Revisited on the back cover; the 1987 EP The $5.98 E.P. - Garage Days Re-Revisited is a reference to this title. The B-sides were later included on the 1988 Elektra Records reissue of Kill 'Em All and the 1998 compilation album Garage Inc..

== Reception ==
It is ranked at #1 on Guitar World's 10 greatest Metallica songs of all time. It was also voted by Rolling Stone readers in 2014 as the sixth greatest Metallica song in the poll "The 10 Best Metallica Songs".

== Track listing ==
International single
No.	Title	Writer(s)	Length
1.	"Creeping Death"	James Hetfield, Lars Ulrich, Kirk Hammett, Cliff Burton	6:36
2.	"Am I Evil?"	Sean Harris, Brian Tatler	7:49
3.	"Blitzkrieg"	Ian Jones, Jim Sirotto, Brian Ross	3:35
Total length:			18:03

Creeping Death/Jump in the Fire EP
No.	Title	Writer(s)	Length
1.	"Creeping Death"	Hetfield, Ulrich, Hammett, Burton	6:36
2.	"Am I Evil?"	Sean Harris, Brian Tatler	7:49
3.	"Blitzkrieg"	Ian Jones, Jim Sirotto, Brian Ross	3:35
4.	"Jump in the Fire"	Hetfield, Ulrich, Dave Mustaine	4:41
5.	"Seek & Destroy" (Live)	Hetfield, Ulrich	7:04
6.	"Phantom Lord" (Live)	Hetfield, Ulrich, Mustaine	4:52

== Personnel ==
Sources: (Note: Producer Flemming Rasmussen posits that either Cliff Burton or Kirk Hammett was mouthing the "Die" chants and not actually singing.)

- James Hetfield – rhythm guitar, vocals
- Kirk Hammett – lead guitar, backing vocals
- Cliff Burton – bass, backing vocals
- Lars Ulrich – drums, backing vocals

== Charts ==
Chart (2026)	Peak position
Greece International (IFPI)	63

== Certifications ==
Region	Certification	Certified units/sales
Australia (ARIA)	Gold	35,000^{‡}
United Kingdom (BPI)	Silver	250,000^{^}
United States (RIAA)	Gold	500,000^{‡}
^{^} Shipments figures based on certification alone.^{‡} Sales+streaming figures based on certification alone.

== Cover versions ==
- Stone Sour - Meanwhile in Burbank....
- Bullet For My Valentine - Scream Aim Fire.
- Apocalyptica - Plays Metallica by Four Cellos
- Drowning Pool - Ozzfest 2002
