= Master of Puppets (song) =

Single by Metallica

from the album Master of Puppets
- B-side: "Welcome Home (Sanitarium)" (7")
- Released: July 2, 1986
- Recorded: October–December 1985
- Studio: Sweet Silence (Copenhagen)
- Genre: Thrash metal
- Length: 8:36
- Label: New Electric Way; Music for Nations; Elektra
- Composers: James Hetfield; Lars Ulrich; Cliff Burton; Kirk Hammett
- Lyricist: James Hetfield
- Producers: Metallica; Flemming Rasmussen

Metallica singles chronology
| "Creeping Death" (1984) | "Master of Puppets" (1986) | "Harvester of Sorrow" (1988) |

Audio sample
- file; help

"Master of Puppets" is a thrash metal song by American metal band Metallica, released on July 2, 1986, as the sole single from the album Master of Puppets. The song has been played frequently in concert, and was praised by the media for its heavy sound.

The song was recorded during October–December 1985, at Sweet Silence Studios in Copenhagen, Denmark.

== Background and composition ==
It is the second and title track of the album, preceded by a shorter, high-speed typical thrash metal track, "Battery", a similar sequencing heard on Metallica's second (Ride the Lightning) and fourth (...And Justice for All) albums. "Master of Puppets" is also notable for its extensive use of downpicking and long instrumental section.

According to Dave Mustaine, Lars Ulrich composed the song's opening riff while Mustaine was still a member of Metallica.

A riff from David Bowie's song "Andy Warhol" is quoted in "Master of Puppets". It is a homage made by Cliff Burton and Kirk Hammett to whom Bowie was a huge influence.

The song was recorded in a lower tempo and tuning and later sped up by Rasmussen running the tapes faster which brought the tuning up to standard 440 Hz. This allowed the instruments to be as tight as possible at a higher tempo. Ulrich later admitted he feels the album version is "too tight".

== Lyrical meaning ==
The song, as lead singer James Hetfield explained, "deals pretty much with drugs. How things get switched around, instead of you controlling what you're taking and doing, it's drugs controlling you."

== Guitar solo ==
The main guitar solo is notable in its own right, due in part to Hammett making a mistake during recording, creating a note he has not been able to reproduce ever since. Using his Jackson Randy Rhoads V guitar, Hammett accidentally pulled the high E-string off the fretboard. The string fretted out on the side of the fretboard, so Hammett grabbed the whammy bar and created the unusual high note. Although he knew he had made a mistake, once he heard it back he thought it sounded great. He later described the incident as "a magic moment that was captured on tape." Writing for Metal Hammer, Jenna Scaramanga stated "the spectacular harmonic at 5:50 is as good as it ever got."

The solo has been named in a number of 'greatest guitar solo' lists, including:

- No 61 in Guitar World's 2004 list of 100 Greatest Guitar Solos of All Time
- No 49 in Guitar World's 2013 Reader poll of the top 50 guitar solos
- No 24 in Planet Rock's 2022 list of Greatest Guitar Solos Ever

== Live performances ==
The videos Cliff 'Em All, S&M, and S&M2 include live performances of "Master of Puppets" in its entirety. A shortened form appears in Cunning Stunts. Both versions can be seen in the video portions of the Live Shit: Binge & Purge box set.

"Master of Puppets" is the band's most played song live, first played on December 31, 1985, at San Francisco's Bill Graham Civic Auditorium for a crowd of 7,000. During the band's World Magnetic Tour, additional live performances were filmed in Mexico City; Nîmes, France and Sofia, Bulgaria. These performances were released on video in November 2009 (Mexico and Nîmes) and October 2010 (Sofia).

== Accolades ==
| Year | Publication | Country | Accolade | Rank |
|---|---|---|---|---|
| 2003 | Martin Popoff | United States | The Top 500 Heavy Metal Songs of All Time | 2 |
| 2004 | Total Guitar | United Kingdom | Top 20 Riffs Of All Time | 7 |
| 2004 | Guitar World | United States | 100 Greatest Guitar Solos of All Time | 61 |
| 2005 | Q Magazine | United Kingdom | 100 Greatest Guitar Tracks | 22 |
| 2006 | VH1 | United States | 40 Greatest Metal Songs | 3 |
| 2008 | Rolling Stone | United States | 100 Greatest Guitar Songs of All Time | 33 |
| 2011 | Gibson | United States | Top Metal Song Of All Time | 1 |
| 2011 | Rock Hard | Germany | Best 250 Rock and Metal Songs | 1 |
| 2012 | Loudwire | United States | 10 Best Metallica Songs | 1 |
| 2013 | Guitar World | United States | Reader Poll: Top 50 Guitar Solos | 49 |
| 2014 | Rolling Stone | United States | Readers’ Poll: The 10 Best Metallica Songs | 2 |
| 2016 | Guitar Player | United States | The 100 Greatest Guitar Riffs of All Time | 39 |
| 2019 | Metal Hammer | United Kingdom | The 50 best Metallica songs of all time | 1 |
| 2021 | Kerrang | United Kingdom | The 20 greatest Metallica songs – ranked | 2 |
| 2021 | Rolling Stone | United States | Top 500 Best Songs of All Time | 256 |
| 2021 | Revolver | United States | Fan Poll: Top 5 Metallica Songs | 1 |
| 2022 | Planet Rock | United Kingdom | Greatest Guitar Solos Ever | 24 |
| 2023 | The A.V. Club | United States | Essential Metallica: Their 30 greatest songs, ranked | 4 |
| 2023 | Rolling Stone | United States | 100 Greatest Heavy Metal Songs of All Time | 2 |
| 2025 | Kink | Netherlands | Gitaarriff Top 100 | 1 |
| 2026 | Ultimate Classic Rock | United States | The Top 100 Rock Songs in Music History | 46 |

== Usage in media ==
"Master of Puppets" is featured in a scene of the 2003 film Old School and is heard as actors Luke Wilson and Will Ferrell play characters who are busy kidnapping people off the street to join their new fraternity. The song was featured in the opening credits for the film Zombieland: Double Tap. The song also appears in a trailer for the game Marvel's Midnight Suns.

The song is featured in the fourth season finale of the Netflix series Stranger Things, where the character Eddie Munson is seen playing the track in the Upside Down to attract the Demobats. The band said they were "blown away" by the scene. As happened with Kate Bush's "Running Up That Hill", which was also featured in the season, "Master of Puppets" regained popularity and started charting again following the release of the finale, notably entering the U.S. and UK charts for the first time since the song's original 1986 release. It then peaked at number four in the Netherlands.

== Track listing ==
All lyrics are written by James Hetfield.

French 7" single
| No. | Title | Music | Length |
|---|---|---|---|
| 1. | "Master of Puppets" (7" Edit) | Hetfield; Lars Ulrich; Cliff Burton; Kirk Hammett | 3:27 |
| 2. | "Welcome Home (Sanitarium)" | Hetfield; Ulrich; Hammett | 4:06 |

== Personnel ==
Credits are adapted from Master of Puppets's liner notes.

Metallica

- James Hetfield – lead vocals, rhythm guitar, 1st guitar solo
- Lars Ulrich – drums, percussion
- Cliff Burton – bass, backing vocals
- Kirk Hammett – lead guitar, 2nd guitar solo

Production

- Metallica – production
- Flemming Rasmussen – production, engineering
- Andy Wroblewski – assistant engineer
- Michael Wagener – mixing
- Mark Wilzcak – assistant mixing engineer
- George Marino – mastering, remastering on 1995 re-release
- Howie Weinberg, Gentry Studer – 2017 remastering

== Charts ==
=== Weekly charts ===
Weekly chart performance for "Master of Puppets"
| Chart (2022) | Peak position |
|---|---|
| Australia (ARIA) | 19 |
| Canada Hot 100 (Billboard) | 32 |
| Czech Republic Singles Digital (ČNS IFPI) | 80 |
| France (SNEP) | 185 |
| Germany (GfK) | 100 |
| Global 200 (Billboard) | 20 |
| Greece International (IFPI) | 12 |
| Hungary (Single Top 40) | 13 |
| Iceland (Tónlistinn) | 16 |
| Ireland (IRMA) | 24 |
| Lithuania (AGATA) | 32 |
| Netherlands (Single Tip) | 4 |
| New Zealand (Recorded Music NZ) | 17 |
| Portugal (AFP) | 47 |
| Slovakia (Singles Digitál Top 100) | 68 |
| Sweden (Sverigetopplistan) | 69 |
| UK Singles (Official Charts) | 22 |
| UK Rock & Metal (Official Charts) | 1 |
| US Billboard Hot 100 | 35 |
| US Hot Rock & Alternative Songs (Billboard) | 5 |
| US Rock & Alternative Airplay (Billboard) | 22 |

=== Year-end charts ===
Year-end chart performance for "Master of Puppets"
| Chart (2022) | Position |
|---|---|
| US Hot Rock & Alternative Songs (Billboard) | 22 |

== Certifications ==
Certifications for "Master of Puppets"
| Region | Certification | Certified units/sales |
|---|---|---|
| Australia (ARIA) | 3× Platinum | 210,000^{‡} |
| Denmark (IFPI Danmark) | Gold | 45,000^{‡} |
| Germany (BVMI) | Gold | 300,000^{‡} |
| Italy (FIMI) | Gold | 25,000^{‡} |
| New Zealand (RMNZ) | 3× Platinum | 90,000^{‡} |
| Portugal (AFP) | Platinum | 40,000^{‡} |
| Spain (Promusicae) | Platinum | 60,000^{‡} |
| United Kingdom (BPI) | Platinum | 600,000^{‡} |
| United States (RIAA) | 3× Platinum | 3,000,000^{‡} |
Streaming
| Greece (IFPI Greece) | Platinum | 2,000,000^{†} |
^{‡} Sales+streaming figures based on certification alone.^{†} Streaming-only figures based on certification alone.

== See also ==
- Songs about substance abuse
