= List of Metal Church members =

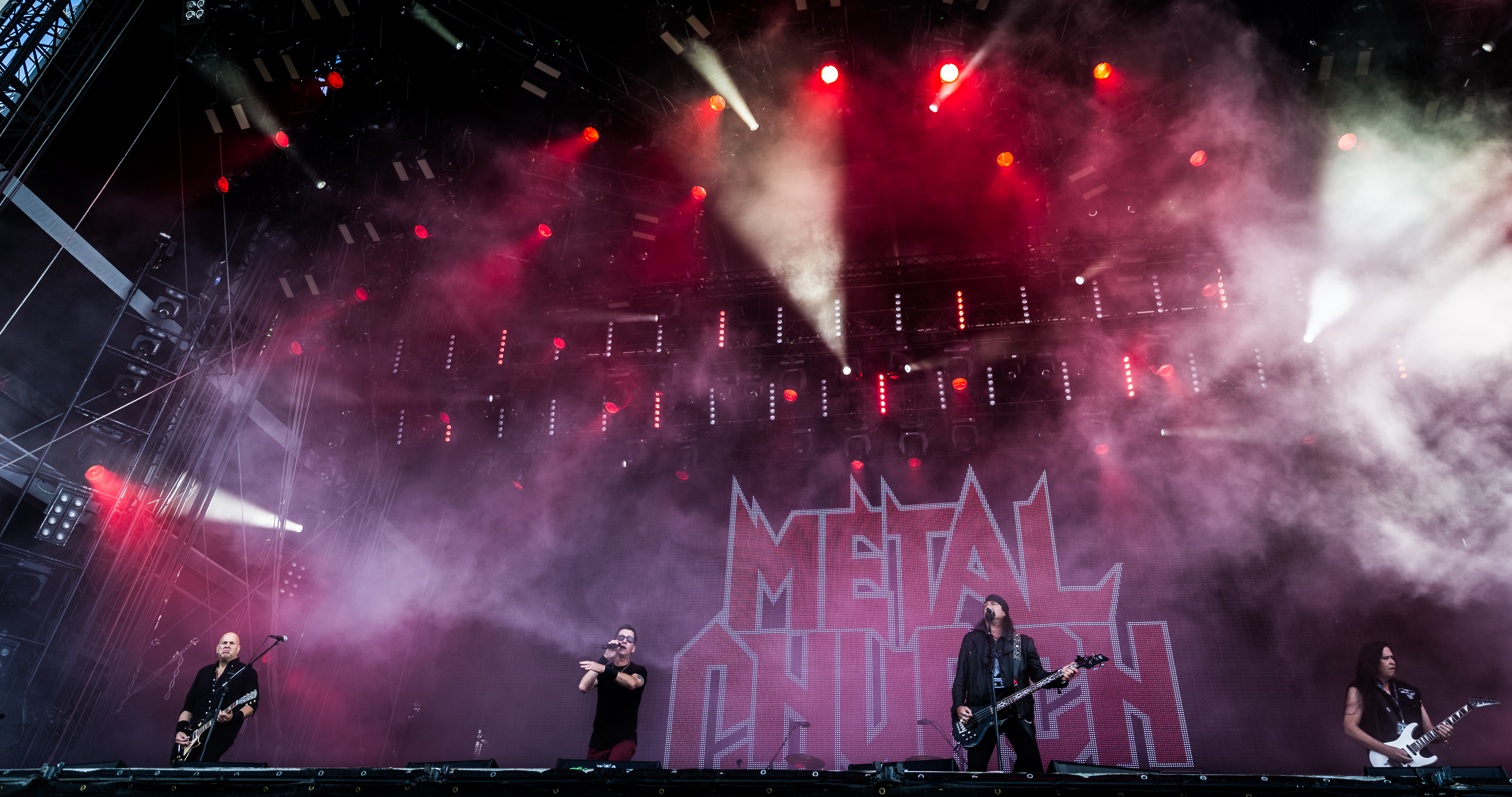
Metal Church performing live in 2016

Metal Church is an American heavy metal band formed in 1980. Originally based in San Francisco, California, the group's first lineup featured vocalist William McKay, lead guitarist Rick "Chief" Condrin, rhythm guitarist Kurdt Vanderhoof, bassist Steve Hott and drummer Rick Wagner. After around a year, Vanderhoof relocated to Aberdeen, Washington, and restarted the group with vocalist Mike Murphy, lead guitarist Craig Wells, bassist Duke Erickson and drummer Tom Weber. The current lineup includes Vanderhoof alongside bassist David Ellefson (since 2025), lead guitarist Rick Van Zandt (since 2008), drummer Ken Mary (since 2025) and vocalist Brian Allen (since 2025).

== History ==
=== 1980–1994 ===
Kurdt Vanderhoof formed the first incarnation of Metal Church while living in San Francisco in 1980. The original lineup included vocalist Billy McKay and drummer Rick Wagner, both of whom were members of Sinister Savage (later Griffin), who remained for around "two to three months". Vanderhoof, McKay and Wagner were initially joined by lead guitarist Rick "Chief" Condrin and bassist Steve Hott. After McKay and Wagner both returned to Griffin later in the year, Ed Bull took over on vocals and Aaron Zimpel joined on drums, however Bull left shortly thereafter due to "tensions" with Condrin. While still in San Francisco, the quartet of Vanderhoof, Condrin, Hott and Zimpel recorded the first Metal Church demo, an instrumental four-track called Red Skies, in 1981.

Later in 1981, Vanderhoof moved to Aberdeen and formed a new version of Metal Church under the name Shrapnel. The initial lineup included vocalist Mike Murphy, lead guitarist Craig Wells, bassist Duke Erickson and drummer Tom Weber, although Murphy left before the recording of the band's next demo, 1982's Hitman. Shortly after, David Wayne replaced Murphy and Kirk Arrington took over from the outgoing Weber; the new lineup released Four Hymns and an untitled third demo in 1983. Shrapnel was also renamed Metal Church in 1983. In 1984, Metal Church released its self-titled debut album on independent label Ground Zero, which leads to Elektra Records signing the group in 1985. The band's major label debut The Dark followed in September 1986.

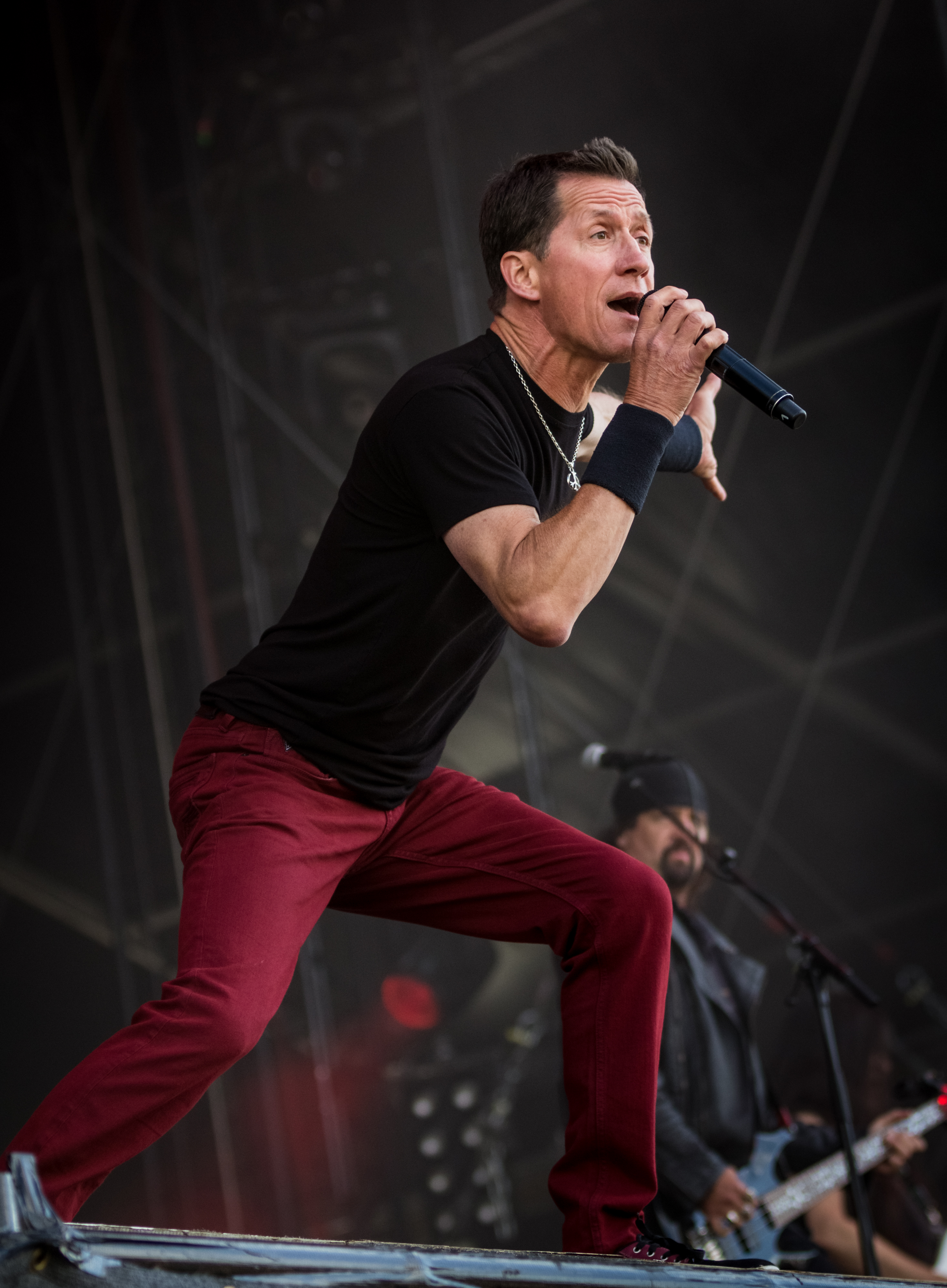
Mike Howe replaced David Wayne in late 1987, remaining until their 1994 breakup. He later rejoined in 2015.

After the recording of The Dark, founding member Kurdt Vanderhoof stepped down from the band's lineup, although he would continue to write material and occasionally feature on future recordings. He was replaced initially on tour by Mark Baker in May 1987, before John Marshall took over on a more permanent basis in August 1987. Around November 22, 1987, Wayne was fired due to substance abuse and creative differences with Kurdt Vanderhoof. Wayne would later go on to form his own group Reverend in 1989. Mike Howe, formerly of Heretic, took Wayne's place as frontman of Metal Church. Howe, Wells, Marshall, Erickson and Arrington released Blessing in Disguise in 1989, The Human Factor in 1991 and Hanging in the Balance in 1993. The band broke up in 1994 due to various "internal conflicts".

=== 1998–2009 ===
In 1998, when compiling the album Live, the 1982–1986 lineup of Metal Church (David Wayne, Craig Wells, Kurdt Vanderhoof, Duke Erickson and Kirk Arrington) reformed to start working on new material; Wells backed out early into the process, however, and John Marshall returned to take his place. The new lineup released Masterpeace in July 1999. For a subsequent European tour, Brian Lake and Jeff Wade filled in for Erickson (who was unable to play due to family commitments) and Arrington (who was detained), respectively. Vanderhoof has subsequently claimed that Arrington was unwell during this period and "barely played" on Masterpeace.

After the 1999 tour dates, Metal Church essentially disbanded. Wayne claimed that "Kurdt and the guys did not want to continue with Metal Church", after which the singer used the band name as the title of his next solo album. Vanderhoof claimed in a 2016 interview that the reunion was "a bad, bad idea", claiming that "We did a tour and it was awful". In the summer of 2001, however, around the time of the release of Wayne's Metal Church album, various band members explained that the group was still together, albeit inactive while Vanderhoof focused on his solo project. Wayne officially announced his departure in June 2001.

Metal Church did not re-emerge until October 2003, when it was announced that a new lineup including Vanderhoof and Arrington alongside vocalist Ronny Munroe, lead guitarist Jay Reynolds and bassist Steve Unger was recording a new album. The album was released as The Weight of the World in 2004. In February 2006, it was announced that Arrington had to leave the group "due to health complications from years of struggling with diabetes". Jeff Plate took his place, starting with recording for A Light in the Dark in January. In February 2008, Jay Reynolds left the band for "personal reasons". Rick Van Zandt replaced him, debuting on This Present Wasteland.

On July 7, 2009, Metal Church announced that it was disbanding, citing "far too much frustration and disappointment in trying to keep moving forward", including the impending (but later reversed) insolvency of its record label SPV GmbH. The group had earlier had to pull out of several live performances due to Vanderhoof's ongoing back problems.

=== Since 2012 ===
Metal Church announced in October 2012 that it would be reforming for shows in 2013, with a lineup of Ronny Munroe, Jay Reynolds, Kurdt Vanderhoof, Steve Unger and Jeff Plate. By the time they played their first show back in January, Rick Van Zandt had returned in Reynolds' place. The band released Generation Nothing later in 2013, and after a subsequent touring cycle, Munroe stepped left to "pursue other interests" in September 2014. His replacement was announced as the returning Mike Howe in April 2015, after a short trial period during which time he wrote new material with Vanderhoof. A new album, XI, was released in 2016. Plate later announced that he was leaving the group in March 2017. The following month, former W.A.S.P. drummer Stet Howland was announced as Plate's replacement.

The band released Damned If You Do in 2018, followed by From the Vault in 2020 which included four new studio tracks. These were the final Metal Church recordings to feature Mike Howe, who died by suicide on July 26, 2021. The band became inactive following Howe's death, with Vanderhoof waiting until September 2022 to confirm that it would continue with a new vocalist, who they had reportedly chosen. In February 2023, it was announced that Marc Lopes was Metal Church's new singer. A new album, Congregation of Annihilation, was released that May.

In November 2025, the line-up changed to feature Vanderhoof and Van Zandt alongside vocalist Brian Allen (ex-Vicious Rumors), bassist David Ellefson (ex-Megadeth) and drummer Ken Mary (Flotsam and Jetsam).

== Members ==
=== Current ===
Image	Name	Years active	Instruments	Release contributions
	Kurdt Vanderhoof	1980–1986; 1998–2009; 2012–present	rhythm guitar; keyboards; backing vocals	all Metal Church releases from Red Skies (1981) to The Dark (1986), and from Live (1986) onwards – plus additional contributions to Blessing in Disguise (1989) and Hanging in the Balance (1993), and songwriting on The Human Factor (1991)
	Rick Van Zandt	2008–2009; 2012–present	lead guitar	all Metal Church releases from This Present Wasteland (2008) onwards
	Brian Allen	2025–present	lead vocals	Dead to Rights (2026)
	David Ellefson	2025–present	bass	Dead to Rights (2026)
	Ken Mary	2025–present	drums	Dead to Rights (2026)

=== Former ===
Image	Name	Years active	Instruments	Release contributions
	Rick "Chief" Condrin	1980 (died 2014)	lead guitar	Red Skies demo (1981)
	Steve Hott	1980	bass	Red Skies demo (1981)
	William McKay	1980	lead vocals	none
	Rick Wagner	1980	drums	none
	Aaron Zimpel	1980 (died 2019)	drums	Red Skies demo (1981)
	Ed Bull	1980	lead vocals	none
	Carl Sacco	1981	drums	none
	Duke Erickson	1981–1994; 1998–1999; 2000–2001	bass	all Metal Church releases from the Hitman demo (1982) to Masterpeace (1999)
	Craig Wells	1981–1994; 1998	lead guitar	all Metal Church releases from the Hitman demo (1982) to Live (1998)
	Tom Weber	1981–1982	drums	Hitman demo (1982)
	Mike Murphy	1981–1982	lead vocals	none
	Kirk Arrington	1982–1994; 1998–1999; 2000–2006 (died 2023)	drums; percussion	all Metal Church releases from the Four Hymns demo (1983) to The Weight of the World (2004)
	David Wayne	1983–1987; 1998–2001 (died 2005)	lead vocals	Four Hymns demo (1983); untitled 1983 demo; Metal Church (1984); The Dark (1986); Live (1998); Masterpeace (1999)
	Mark Baker	1987	rhythm guitar	none
	John Marshall	1987–1994; 1998–2001	guitar (rhythm 1986–1996, lead 1998–2001)	all Metal Church releases from Blessing in Disguise (1989) to Hanging in the Balance (1993); Masterpeace (1999)
	Mike Howe	1988–1994; 2015–2021 (until his death)	lead vocals	all Metal Church releases from Blessing in Disguise (1989) to Hanging in the Balance (1993), and from "Badlands" (2015) to From the Vault (2020)
	Steve Unger	2003–2009; 2012–2025	bass; backing vocals	all Metal Church releases from The Weight of the World (2004) to Congregation of Annihilation (2023)
	Ronny Munroe	2003–2009; 2012–2014	lead vocals	The Weight of the World (2004); A Light in the Dark (2006); This Present Wasteland (2008); Generation Nothing (2013)
	Jay Reynolds	2003–2008; 2012	lead guitar	The Weight of the World (2004); A Light in the Dark (2006)
	Jeff Plate	2006–2009; 2012–2017	drums; percussion	all Metal Church releases from A Light in the Dark (2006) to Classic Live (2017)
	Stet Howland	2017–2025	drums; percussion	Damned If You Do (2018); From the Vault (2020) – four new tracks; Congregation of Annihilation (2023)
	Marc Lopes	2023–2025	lead vocals	Congregation of Annihilation (2023)

=== Touring ===
Image	Name	Years active	Instruments	Details
	Brian Lake	1999	bass	Lake temporarily replaced Duke Erickson, who was unable to tour due to family commitments, in 1999.
	Jeff Wade	1999	drums	Wade performed some drums on Masterpeace and took over from Kirk Arrington on the subsequent tour.
	Ira Black	2005	rhythm guitar	Black substituted for Kurdt Vanderhoof in summer 2005 when the guitarist had "prior commitments".
	Paul Kleff	2016	lead guitar	Kleff and Caffery stepped in for Rick Van Zandt during early 2016 when he had to have eye surgery.
	Chris Caffery	2016	lead guitar	Kleff and Caffery stepped in for Rick Van Zandt during early 2016 when he had to have eye surgery.
	Bobby Ferkovich	2019	bass; backing vocals	Ferkovich performed on an Australian tour in the summer of 2019 when Steve Unger couldn't make it.

== Lineups ==
Period	Members	Releases
1980	William McKay – vocals; Rick Condrin – lead guitar; Kurdt Vanderhoof – rhythm guitar; Steve Hott – bass; Rick Wagner – drums	none – live shows only
1980	Ed Bull – vocals; Rick Condrin – lead guitar; Kurdt Vanderhoof – rhythm guitar; Steve Hott – bass; Aaron Zimpel – drums	none – live shows only
1980–1981	Rick Condrin – lead guitar; Kurdt Vanderhoof – rhythm guitar; Steve Hott – bass; Aaron Zimpel – drums	Red Skies demo (1981)
1981	Rick Condrin – lead guitar; Kurdt Vanderhoof – rhythm guitar; Steve Hott – bass; Carl Sacco – drums	none – live shows only
1981 (as Shrapnel)	Mike Murphy – vocals; Craig Wells – lead guitar; Kurdt Vanderhoof – rhythm guitar; Duke Erickson – bass; Tom Weber – drums	none – live shows only
1981–1982 (as Shrapnel)	Craig Wells – lead guitar; Kurdt Vanderhoof – rhythm guitar; Duke Erickson – bass; Tom Weber – drums	Hitman demo (1982)
Early 1983 – summer 1986 (initially as Shrapnel)	David Wayne – vocals; Craig Wells – lead guitar; Kurdt Vanderhoof – rhythm guitar; Duke Erickson – bass; Kirk Arrington – drums, percussion	Four Hymns demo (1983); untitled 1983 demo; Metal Church (1984); The Dark (1986)
Mid 1987 - summer 1987	David Wayne – vocals; Craig Wells – lead guitar; Mark Baker – rhythm guitar; Duke Erickson – bass; Kirk Arrington – drums, percussion	none – live shows only
Late 1987 – fall 1987	David Wayne – vocals; Craig Wells – lead guitar; John Marshall – rhythm guitar; Duke Erickson – bass; Kirk Arrington – drums, percussion	none – live shows only
1988–1994	Mike Howe – vocals; Craig Wells – lead guitar; John Marshall – rhythm guitar; Duke Erickson – bass; Kirk Arrington – drums, percussion	Blessing in Disguise (1989); "Iron Man" (with Sir Mix-a-Lot) (1989); untitled 1990 demo; The Human Factor (1991); Hanging in the Balance (1993)
Band inactive 1995–1998
1998	David Wayne – vocals; Craig Wells – lead guitar; Kurdt Vanderhoof – rhythm guitar; Duke Erickson – bass; Kirk Arrington – drums, percussion	none – live shows only
Late 1998 – June 2001	David Wayne – vocals; John Marshall – lead guitar; Kurdt Vanderhoof – rhythm guitar; Duke Erickson – bass; Kirk Arrington – drums, percussion	Masterpeace (1999)
Band on hiatus 2001–2003
October 2003 – January 2006	Ronny Munroe – lead vocals; Jay Reynolds – lead guitar; Kurdt Vanderhoof – rhythm guitar, keyboards; Steve Unger – bass, backing vocals; Kirk Arrington – drums, percussion	The Weight of the World (2004)
January 2006 – February 2008	Ronny Munroe – lead vocals; Jay Reynolds – lead guitar; Kurdt Vanderhoof – rhythm guitar, keyboards; Steve Unger – bass, backing vocals; Jeff Plate – drums, percussion	A Light in the Dark (2006)
February 2008 – July 2009	Ronny Munroe – lead vocals; Rick Van Zandt – lead guitar; Kurdt Vanderhoof – rhythm guitar, keyboards; Steve Unger – bass, backing vocals; Jeff Plate – drums, percussion	This Present Wasteland (2008)
Band inactive July 2009 – October 2012
October – late 2012	Ronny Munroe – lead vocals; Jay Reynolds – lead guitar; Kurdt Vanderhoof – rhythm guitar, keyboards; Steve Unger – bass, backing vocals; Jeff Plate – drums, percussion	none – rehearsals only
Late 2012 – September 2014	Ronny Munroe – lead vocals; Rick Van Zandt – lead guitar; Kurdt Vanderhoof – rhythm guitar, keyboards; Steve Unger – bass, backing vocals; Jeff Plate – drums, percussion	Generation Nothing (2013)
April 2015 – March 2017	Mike Howe – lead vocals; Rick Van Zandt – lead guitar; Kurdt Vanderhoof – rhythm guitar, keyboards; Steve Unger – bass, backing vocals; Jeff Plate – drums, percussion	"Badlands" (2015); XI (2016); Classic Live (2017)
April 2017 – July 2021	Mike Howe – lead vocals; Rick Van Zandt – lead guitar; Kurdt Vanderhoof – rhythm guitar, keyboards; Steve Unger – bass, backing vocals; Stet Howland – drums, percussion	Damned If You Do (2018); From the Vault (2020) – four new tracks
Band on hiatus July 2021 – February 2023
February 2023 – November 2025	Marc Lopes – lead vocals; Rick Van Zandt – lead guitar; Kurdt Vanderhoof – rhythm guitar, keyboards; Steve Unger – bass, backing vocals; Stet Howland – drums, percussion	Congregation of Annihilation (2023)
November 2025 – present	Brian Allen – lead vocals; Rick Van Zandt – lead guitar; Kurdt Vanderhoof – rhythm guitar, keyboards; David Ellefson – bass, backing vocals; Ken Mary – drums, percussion	Dead to Rights (2026)
