= Blessing in Disguise (Metal Church album) =

Studio album by Metal Church
- Released: February 7, 1989
- Recorded: August 29 – October 4, 1988
- Studio: Kajem/Victory Recording, Gladwyne, Pennsylvania
- Genre: Heavy metal; power metal; progressive metal
- Length: 54:34
- Label: Elektra/Asylum
- Producer: Terry Date

Metal Church chronology
The Dark (1986)	Blessing in Disguise (1989)	The Human Factor (1991)

Singles from Blessing in Disguise
- 1. "Fake Healer" Released: 1989; 2. "Badlands" Released: 1989

Blessing in Disguise is the third studio album by American heavy metal band Metal Church, released on February 7, 1989.

== Overview ==
Blessing in Disguise was Metal Church's final release on Elektra Records, and the first album not to feature the vocals of David Wayne, due to his departure to form the band Reverend. This album marked the band's debut with vocalist Mike Howe (formerly of Heretic) and guitarist John Marshall, replacing Wayne and Kurdt Vanderhoof respectively. Vanderhoof had produced Heretic's final album Breaking Point previously. It seems that this is how Howe came to the attention of Metal Church. Wayne's new project was made up of the remaining members of Heretic.

Blessing in Disguise also marked the second and last time Metal Church had worked with Terry Date, who also produced the band's 1984 self-titled debut album. Although Vanderhoof was technically no longer an official member of the band at this point, he composed the music and lyrics for seven of the album's nine songs and appears as a guest musician. Vanderhoof would continue to compose music and lyrics for Metal Church on their next two albums before he returned to the band as an official member in 1998. David Wayne claimed to have written songs for the album before leaving the band. One of these tracks was an early version of "Fake Healer" titled "Legion". Despite these assertions, Wayne is left uncredited in the album credits. Notably, Wayne would later record "Legion" in Reverend's EP A Gathering of Demons in 2001.

Blessing in Disguise has been seen as one of Metal Church's most diverse works, minimizing most of the thrash and speed metal elements of their first two albums and developing an experimentation with a more progressive tone, similar to those of Metallica and Queensrÿche. The album's style has also been described as power metal or simply heavy metal, and it includes the band's 2nd longest track to date "Anthem to the Estranged".

== Critical and commercial reception ==
Professional ratings
Review scores
Source	Rating
AllMusic	4/5 stars
Collector's Guide to Heavy Metal	9/10
Kerrang!	3/5 stars
Rock Hard	8.5/10

Contemporary reviews were mixed. Don Kaye of Kerrang! judged Blessing in Disguise "a hit-and-miss affair" that does not "live up to the standards set on (Metal Church) 1984 debut", lamenting "a lack of direction, an absence of focus that causes the record to fluctuate between greatness and mere mediocrity". He cited "Anthem to the Estranged" and "Badlands" as the best songs, "providing a real showcase for new singer Mike Howe, who elsewhere on the album comes across as a dime-a-dozen screamer." Rock Hard reviewer considered the album "better than the predecessor The Dark", but "still light years away from the landmark Metal Church"; he wrote that Blessing in Disguise is largely missing "the ultimate kick, the esprit, the special", despite being one of "the best-produced albums of recent times", thanks to Terry Date's hard work.

Modern reviews for Blessing in Disguise have been more positive. AllMusic's Jason Anderson considered the album "perhaps the finest Metal Church release", offering "some of the best material in the group's long career" and praised Howe for "bringing a burst of energy that the group used to create some of the best American underground metal of the decade." Martin Popoff in his Collector's Guide to Heavy Metal praised Howe's performance and Date's production, which turned "the band into an updated, renovated tower of strength, a guitar-driven machine set to stun." Adam McCann of Metal Digest referred to Blessing in Disguise as both "a real classic album released in 1989" and a "late 80's classic that often gets overlooked", and noted that, "This was the album which marked the debut of the late, great Mike Howe on vocals as the band moved away from the heavy metal of their first two albums and into territory more akin with the burgeoning movements of progressive and power metal, particularly the former with the band bringing in fans from both Metallica, Fates Warning and Queensrÿche with this album riding the coattails of Operation: Mindcrime, ...And Justice for All and Awaken the Guardian."

Blessing in Disguise entered the Billboard 200 chart on April 8, 1989, two months after its release. The album itself peaked at number 75 (the band's second-highest chart position to date, a record broken only 27 years later by XI, which peaked at number 57), and remained on the chart for 15 weeks.

== Touring and promotion ==
Metal Church spent most of 1989 and 1990 touring behind Blessing in Disguise. They embarked a U.S. tour in the spring of 1989 with Meliah Rage, and supported W.A.S.P. on their Headless Children tour. Metal Church played one show in Germany in October 1989 with Fates Warning and Toranaga, and opened for Saxon in Europe in April 1990. They were also a "surprise guest" for Metallica's May 11, 1990 show at The Marquee in London.

== Track listing ==
All lyrics are written by Kurdt Vanderhoof, except where noted; all music is composed by Vanderhoof and Craig Wells, except where noted.

No.	Title	Lyrics	Music	Length
1.	"Fake Healer"			5:55
2.	"Rest in Pieces (April 15, 1912)"			6:38
3.	"Of Unsound Mind" (based on Edgar Allan Poe's "Tell-Tale Heart")	John Marshall	Wells	4:44
4.	"Anthem to the Estranged"			9:31
5.	"Badlands"	Vanderhoof, Mike Howe		7:21
6.	"The Spell Can't Be Broken"		Wells, Vanderhoof, Marshall	6:46
7.	"It's a Secret"	Instrumental	Wells	3:47
8.	"Cannot Tell a Lie"		Wells, Vanderhoof, Marshall	4:17
9.	"The Powers That Be"			5:22

== Personnel ==
Metal Church

- Mike Howe – vocals
- Craig Wells – lead guitar
- John Marshall – rhythm guitar
- Duke Erickson – bass
- Kirk Arrington – drums

Additional musicians

- Kurdt Vanderhoof – additional guitars

Production

- Terry Date – producer, engineer, mixing
- Joe Alexander – engineer, mixing
- Brian Stover, Trish Finnegan – assistant engineers
- Metal Church – arranger
- Howie Weinberg – mastering at Masterdisk, New York
- Darryl Estrine – photography
- Walter O'Brienn, Bob Chiappardi, Diane Sherman – management

== Charts ==
Chart (1989)	Peak position
German Albums (Offizielle Top 100)	39
US Billboard 200	75
