= Masterpeace =

Studio album by Metal Church
- Released: July 22, 1999
- Recorded: 1998–1999
- Studio: The English Channel Studio (Olympia, Washington)
- Genre: Thrash metal; speed metal
- Length: 54:42
- Label: Nuclear Blast America (US); SPV/Steamhammer (Europe)
- Producer: Kurdt Vanderhoof, Mark Greer

Metal Church chronology
| Live (1998) | Masterpeace (1999) | The Weight of the World (2004) |

Professional ratings
Review scores
| Source | Rating |
|---|---|
| AllMusic | 3/5 stars |
| Collector's Guide to Heavy Metal | 7/10 |
| Exclaim! | (negative) |
| Rock Hard | 8/10 |

Masterpeace is the sixth studio album by American heavy metal band Metal Church released on July 22, 1999 via Nuclear Blast. It features the return of vocalist David Wayne, absent since The Dark (1986), being the band's final studio album to feature him before his death in May 2005. All original members recorded on Masterpeace except guitarist Craig Wells and drummer Kirk Arrington. Jeff Wade (the "friendly ghost") filled in for Arrington on the album and on tour. This was the second Metal Church album to feature the cruciform Gibson Explorer on a cover, the first being the band's 1984 debut.

== Album information ==
Retrospectively, Vanderhoof criticized the failed reunion for the album, calling it "Disasterpeace." He cited issues with management, as well as with Wayne and Arrington: "The whole thing was a great idea, but when we tried to put together, it just didn't work."

== Reception ==
Steve Huey of Allmusic compared Masterpeace favorably with its predecessor, calling the album "more focused." On the contrary, Sean Palmerson of Exclaim! said that the band sounded "lost in the fog" on the album.

== Track listing ==
All tracks written by Kurdt Vanderhoof and David Wayne, except where noted

| No. | Title | Writer(s) | Length |
|---|---|---|---|
| 1. | "Sleeps with Thunder" | Vanderhoof | 6:00 |
| 2. | "Falldown" | | 4:37 |
| 3. | "Into Dust" | | 4:15 |
| 4. | "Kiss for the Dead" | | 6:49 |
| 5. | "Lb. of Cure" | | 4:31 |
| 6. | "Faster Than Life" | | 4:51 |
| 7. | "Masterpeace" (instrumental) | Vanderhoof | 1:54 |
| 8. | "All Your Sorrows" | | 5:39 |
| 9. | "They Signed in Blood" | | 7:27 |
| 10. | "Toys in the Attic" (Aerosmith cover) | Steven Tyler, Joe Perry | 3:12 |
| 11. | "Sand Kings" | | 4:40 |

== Credits ==
Production and performance credits are adapted from the album liner notes.

Metal Church

- David Wayne – vocals
- John Marshall – lead guitar
- Kurdt Vanderhoof – rhythm guitar, mellotron
- Duke Erickson – bass
- Kirk Arrington – drums

Additional musicians

- Jeff Wade – drums

Production

- Produced, recorded and mixed by Kurdt Vanderhoof and Mark Greer
- Engineered by Mark Greer and Karl Welty
