= Northwest Metalfest =

Compilation album by various artists
- Released: 1984
- Recorded: 1983–1984
- Genre: Hard rock; heavy metal; thrash metal
- Length: 40:28
- Label: Ground Zero Records (US), Steamhammer (Germany)

Northwest Metalfest is a compilation album of songs by ten different Seattle-area metal bands, first released in 1984 by Ground Zero Records in the U.S. and Steamhammer Records in Germany.

== Track listing ==
The length listed is taken from the CD edition.

Side A
No.	Title	Writer(s)	Artist	Length
1.	"Daily Grind"	Pasarelli	Lipstick	4:12
2.	"Cry for the Nations"	Open Fire	Open Fire	3:50
3.	"Fantasy & Science Fiction"	Koda Khan	Koda Khan	2:48
4.	"On the Edge"	Logan/Van Liew	Overlord	3:25
5.	"Intense as Hell"	Rottweiller	Rottweiller	4:56

Side B
No.	Title	Writer(s)	Artist	Length
1.	"The Loser"	C. Holt	Bondage Boys	4:03
2.	"Leather Warrior"	Lee, Jeffries	Sato	4:24
3.	"Deadline"	G. Stock	Strike	3:34
4.	"Marching Saprophytes"	Mace	Mace	4:04
5.	"Death Wish"	Metal Church	Metal Church	4:48

== Personnel ==
=== Bands ===
Lipstick

- Paul Passarelli – vocals
- Brock Graue – guitar
- Brett Miller – bass
- Jeff Cardelli – drums

Open Fire

- Greg Costa – vocals
- Phil See – guitar, keyboard
- Bob Fisher – guitar
- Mark Stella – bass
- Kevin Merriam – drums

Koda Khan

- Bill Ackron – vocals
- Doug Roberts – guitar
- Cory Sandahl – bass
- Jay Roberts – drums

Overlord

- Steve Van Liew – vocals
- Glen Logan – guitar
- Kurt Lofstrom – guitar
- Doug Blake – bass
- Kenny Kubsen – drums

Rottweiller

- Paul Crisman – vocals
- Michael Winston – guitar
- Tim Wolfe – bass
- Doug Marrapodi – drums

Bondage Boys

- Vaun Hammer – vocals
- Geode V. Winson – guitar
- Rexx D'Le'Roxx – bass
- Father Onray – drums

Sato

- Dean Jeffries – vocals
- Terry Lee – guitar
- Ken Kramer – guitar
- Mike Starr – bass
- Dave Jensen – drums

Strike

- Joe Milner – vocals
- Gregg Stock – guitar
- Scott Piteo – bass
- Ken Mary – drums

Mace

- Vence Larose – vocals, drums
- Dave Hillis – guitar
- Kirk Verhay – bass

Metal Church

- David Wayne – vocals
- Kurdt Vanderhoof – guitar
- Craig Wells – guitar
- Duke Erickson – bass
- Kirk Arrington – drums

=== Production ===
Individual tracks/bands

- Produced and engineered by Tom Hall (A1); Open Fire, David Thompson, and Brad Spur (A2); Koda Khan and Gordy Kjellberg (A3); Overlord and Tom Bertoldi (A4); Bondage Boys and Don Dodge (B1); Sato and Tom Hall (B2); Mace and Tom Bertoldi (B4); Metal Church and Richard Rogers (B5)
- Produced by Goldy McJohn, Gordy Kjellberg, Rottweiler (A5); Gregg Stock (B3)
- Engineered by Terry Date (B3)
- Remixing by Jack Barr (B5)
- Band photos by Patricia Ridenour (Lipstick); Lynn DeBon (Open Fire); Greg Cass (Koda Khan); Julianne Anderson (Overlord); Mike Crisman (Rottweiler); Craig Holt (Bondage Boys); Ashly Bexten (Sato, Mace); Saulis Pempe (Strike); Randy Butler (Metal Church)
- Stage Managing by John Stocks (Open Fire)

Album

- Executive produced by Jeff Gilbert and Willie Mackay
- Sequencing and equalization by Tom Hall
- Mastered by Ron Luder
- Cover art by Vern White
- Logo design – Stacy Sidener
- Liner notes by Glen Boyd
- Album title by Brett Miller
- Inspiration by Diane Harris and Kim Harris

== Band releases ==
Koda Khan

- Tales from the Darkside 83–88 (compilation album) (2016)

Overlord

- Broken Toys (extended play) (1982)
- Broken Toys: Expanded Deluxe Edition (2017)

Rottweiller

- Screams of the Innocent (2002)
- Rage of War (2004)

Sato

- Leather Warriors – Sato Anthology 82/86 (CD+DVD) (2017)

Strike

- Strike (extended play) (1984)

Mace

- Process of Elimination (1985)
- The Evil in Good (1987)

Metal Church

- Metal Church discography
