= XI (album) =

Studio album by Metal Church
- Released: March 25, 2016
- Recorded: 2015
- Genres: Heavy metal; thrash metal
- Length: 58:30
- Label: Rat Pak Records
- Producers: Kurdt Vanderhoof, Chris "Wizard" Collier

Metal Church chronology
Generation Nothing (2013)	XI (2016)	Damned If You Do (2018)

Singles from XI
- 1. "No Tomorrow" Released: January 5, 2016; 2. "Killing Your Time" Released: February 11, 2016; 3. "Reset" Released: March 18, 2016

XI is the eleventh studio album by American heavy metal band Metal Church. It was released on March 25, 2016, and is the band's first album in 23 years (since Hanging in the Balance) to feature vocalist Mike Howe. XI was considered a comeback for both Metal Church and Howe since the latter's hiatus from the music industry following the band's first breakup in 1996; the album received generally positive reviews, and was their first studio album since 1989's Blessing in Disguise to enter the Billboard 200 chart, where it peaked at number 57, the band's highest chart position in their career. This is also Metal Church's final album with drummer Jeff Plate, who left the band almost exactly a year after its release.

== Background ==
In 2014, a year after the release of the band's tenth album, Generation Nothing, longtime vocalist Ronny Munroe announced he was quitting the band. In April of the next year, it was announced that former vocalist Mike Howe had rejoined the band. This lineup subsequently recorded and released a new version of the song "Badlands" (from the band's 1989 debut album with Howe, Blessing in Disguise).

Mike Howe spoke about his absence from the music scene for two decades before his return to the band in 2015. He said: "I dropped off the radar because the record business really disappointed me. Things were changing, grunge was coming up and we were getting ignored. We were not businessmen, we were musicians, and like a lot of [other] bands, we just wanted to write songs and play metal."

Over the course of 2015, the band announced its intention of releasing another album featuring Howe. He added - "the biggest thing for us was being able to write, record and present an album of material that represented us and who we are today from beginning to end without any external pressures, timelines or anything like that, and that's exactly what we did. We are very happy about this and it's allowed us to relax, be big kids again and enjoy the process".

In January 2016, Metal Church released a video for a new song, "No Tomorrow" as the album's first single, with the band announcing a title and track listing for the album at the same time. Another video, for the song "Killing Your Time" was released in February. On March 18, one week prior to the album's release, the band released a lyric video for "Reset." A video for "Needle and Suture" was released on December 6.

== Critical reception ==
Professional ratings
Aggregate scores
Source	Rating
Metacritic	70/100
Review scores
Source	Rating
AllMusic	3.5/5 stars
Blabbermouth.net	8.5/10
Brave Words & Bloody Knuckles	9/10
KNAC	4.6/5
Classic Rock	3.5/5 stars

XI received an average score of 70/100 on Metacritic, indicating "generally favorable reviews". Metal Underground rated the album four stars out of five and called it "a must buy for long time and new fans of the band and should be placed on the mantle in the same light as Howe, Phase One." AllMusic writer James Christopher Monger gave XI three-and-a-half out of five stars, and states that it "feels a bit more lived-in and immediate than 2013's so-so Generation Nothing." Monger finished his review, saying that "Metal Church seem to have finally found the sweet spot between the thrash-kissed days of yore and the more traditional yet no less meaty metal stylings of their 21st century incarnation." Angry Metal Guy commented on Mike Howe's remarkably unchanged bellowing snarl as out in front of hooky, meaty riffs that walk a fine line between traditional metal and hard rock that it feels like old times all over again. Brave Words & Bloody Knuckles concurred that the return of Mike Howe is the show-stealer, the clarity and bite of his voice makes for a raucous return.

=== Commercial performance ===
XI sold 11,000 copies in its first week of release in the United States, and debuted at number 57 on the Billboard 200 chart, making it their highest chart position, and their first entry on the Billboard 200 chart in 27 years (since Blessing in Disguise). It also became the band's highest-charting album in Germany, peaking at number 34, and becoming their first album to chart there since Hanging in the Balance reached number 79 in 1994.

=== Touring and promotion ===
To support XI and the return of Mike Howe, the band co-headlined a West Coast North American tour with Armored Saint in June 2016, They also appeared in multiple European festivals including Alcatraz Metal Festival, Wacken Open Air, Porispere Festival, Dynamo Open Air, Rock Hard Festival as well as the first edition of Ozzfest Meets Knotfest which took place in San Bernardino, California. Along with Amon Amarth, Suicidal Tendencies and Butcher Babies, they supported Megadeth on the latter's Dystopia arena tour in September–October 2016. To wrap up a successful year of touring and promotion, the band released a music video in December for "Needle And Suture", directed by Jamie Brown of Smokin' Gun Video Productions.

== Track listing ==
All music by Kurdt Vanderhoof; all lyrics by Vanderhoof and Mike Howe.

No.	Title	Length
1.	"Reset"	3:53
2.	"Killing Your Time"	5:06
3.	"No Tomorrow"	5:08
4.	"Signal Path"	7:12
5.	"Sky Falls In"	7:01
6.	"Needle and Suture"	4:38
7.	"Shadow"	4:08
8.	"Blow Your Mind"	6:28
9.	"Soul Eating Machine"	4:41
10.	"It Waits"	5:15
11.	"Suffer Fools"	4:54
Total length:		58:30

European bonus track
No.	Title	Length
12.	"Fan the Fire"	3:47

Japan bonus track
No.	Title	Length
12.	"Long Time Coming"	5:29

Rat Pak Records website exclusive edition bonus disc
No.	Title	Length
1.	"The Coward"	4:12
2.	"Blister Fist"	3:29
3.	"God Hit"	4:04
4.	"The Enemy Mind"	3:08
5.	"Signal Path" (Radio edit)	4:28
6.	"Badlands" (2015 version)	7:22
7.	"Shadow" (Demo version)	4:21
8.	"No Tomorrow" (Alternate mix)	4:45

=== Accolades ===
Publication	Accolade	Work	Year	Rank	Ref.
Darkside Records & Gallery	Best of 2016 Lists	XI	2016	1	
Sentinel Daily	Top 100 Albums of 2016	XI	2016	2	
Brave Words & Bloody Knuckles	Bravepicks 2016 Top 31	XI	2016	5	
Limelight	Top Albums of 2016	XI	2016	7	
Worship Metal	The 10 Greatest Thrash Albums Of 2016	XI	2016	8	
HRH Mag	2016 Best of The Best - Critics' Pick	XI	2016	9	
Something Else Reviews	Fred Phillips' Best Hard Rock and Metal of 2016	XI	2016	10	

== Personnel ==
Credits adapted from the album's liner notes.

Metal Church

- Mike Howe – vocals
- Rick Van Zandt – lead guitar
- Kurdt Vanderhoof – rhythm guitar, Mellotron, synthesizer
- Steve Unger – bass
- Jeff Plate – drums

Production

- Produced and mastered by Kurdt Vanderhoof
- Mixed by Kurdt Vanderhoof and Chris "Wizard" Collier

== Charts ==
Chart (2016)	Peak position
Austrian Albums (Ö3 Austria)	51
Belgian Albums (Ultratop Flanders)	94
French Albums (SNEP)	153
Swiss Albums (Schweizer Hitparade)	30
German Albums (Offizielle Top 100)	34
Swiss Albums (Schweizer Hitparade)	30
UK Independent Albums (Official Charts)	42
UK Rock & Metal Albums (Official Charts)	25
US Billboard 200	57
