= Congregation of Annihilation =

Studio album by Metal Church
- Released: May 26, 2023
- Genre: Heavy metal; thrash metal
- Length: 49:10
- Label: Rat Pak
- Producer: Kurdt Vanderhoof

Metal Church chronology
Damned If You Do (2018)	Congregation of Annihilation (2023)	Dead to Rights (2026)

Singles from Congregation of Annihilation
- 1. "Pick a God and Prey" Released: March 24, 2023; 2. "Making Monsters" Released: April 28, 2023

Congregation of Annihilation is the thirteenth studio album by American heavy metal band Metal Church, released on May 26, 2023 through Rat Pak Records. It is the only album to feature vocalist Marc Lopes, who replaced Mike Howe a year after the latter's death, and their last with bassist Steve Unger and drummer Stet Howland.

== Composition ==
Metal Church guitarist Kurdt Vanderhoof described the album as "starting a new chapter in the Metal Church legacy. I really love this album. It's a fresh approach for us in one way, but also a return to the very beginnings of Metal Church as part of the New American Thrash Metal movement. This record contains some of the most aggressive songs we have recorded. I hope the fans will like it as much as we do." Marc Lopes also added that "I am beyond honored to be part of carrying on this legacy into a new era of Metal Church. Working with Kurdt and a band that was a huge influence of mine growing up was a surreal experience, to say the least. For me there was no point in trying to imitate what was already done to perfection. So, with respect to the past, we moved forward to a new chapter and here we are!"

== Track listing ==
No.	Title	Length
1.	"Another Judgement Day"	3:37
2.	"Congregation of Annihilation"	4:24
3.	"Pick a God and Prey"	4:40
4.	"Children of the Lie"	5:48
5.	"Me the Nothing"	5:33
6.	"Making Monsters"	5:29
7.	"Say a Prayer with 7 Bullets"	3:35
8.	"These Violent Thrills"	3:46
9.	"All That We Destroy"	4:11
10.	"My Favorite Sin" (bonus track)	4:24
11.	"Salvation" (bonus track)	3:44
Total length:		49:10

Vinyl and Reaper Entertainment release bonus track
No.	Title	Length
11.	"Laughter"	3:35

Japan bonus track
No.	Title	Length
11.	"The Dreams (That Don't Come True)"	4:17

== Notes ==
- The limited edition CD release by Reaper Entertainment contains a cassette and features a different bonus track titled "Laughter"
- The Japanese release by Rubicon Music features a different bonus track titled "The Dreams (That Don't Come True)"

== Personnel ==
Metal Church

- Marc Lopes – vocals
- Rick Van Zandt – lead guitar
- Kurdt Vanderhoof – rhythm guitar
- Steve Unger – bass, backing vocals
- Stet Howland – drums

Production

- Produced by Kurdt Vanderhoof
- Engineered by Kurdt Vanderhoof and Johnny Hyatt
- Album artwork and layout design by Jean Michel

== Charts ==
Chart (2023)	Peak position
Austrian Albums (Ö3 Austria)	50
German Albums (Offizielle Top 100)	14
Scottish Albums (OCC)	83
Swiss Albums (Schweizer Hitparade)	25
UK Independent Albums (OCC)	27
UK Rock & Metal Albums (OCC)	20
