= Dead to Rights (album) =

Studio album by Metal Church
- Released: April 10, 2026
- Recorded: 2025
- Studio: English Channel (Yucca Valley, California)
- Genre: Heavy metal, thrash metal
- Length: 53:40
- Label: Rat Pak
- Producer: Kurdt Vanderhoof

Metal Church chronology
Congregation of Annihilation (2023)	Dead to Rights (2026)

Singles from Dead to Rights
- 1. "F.A.F.O." Released: November 21, 2025; 2. "Brainwash Game" Released: February 13, 2026

Dead to Rights is the fourteenth studio album by the American heavy metal band Metal Church, released on April 10, 2026. It marks the debut of the band's new lineup, with vocalist Brian Allen, bassist David Ellefson and drummer Ken Mary replacing Marc Lopes, Steve Unger and Stet Howland, respectively.

== Track listing ==
All tracks are written by Kurdt Vanderhoof.

Dead to Rights track listing
No.	Title	Length
1.	"Brainwash Game"	4:30
2.	"F.A.F.O."	3:46
3.	"Dead to Rights"	6:06
4.	"Deep Cover Shakedown"	4:22
5.	"Feet to the Fire"	5:42
6.	"The Show"	5:11
7.	"Heaven Knows (Slip Away)"	4:34
8.	"No Memory"	4:29
9.	"Wasted Time"	3:58
10.	"My Wrath"	4:32
11.	"Blood and Water" (bonus track)	6:30
Total length:		53:40

European bonus track
No.	Title	Length
11.	"Yesterday Begins"	6:01

Japan bonus track
No.	Title	Length
11.	"Coming for You"	3:53

== Personnel ==
Credits are adapted from Tidal and Metal Church's website.

=== Metal Church ===
- Kurdt Vanderhoof – guitar, production
- Rick Van Zandt – guitar
- David Ellefson – bass
- Ken Mary – drums
- Brian Allen – vocals

=== Additional contributor ===
- Zeuss – mixing, mastering

== Charts ==
Chart performance for Dead to Rights
Chart (2026)	Peak position
Austrian Albums (Ö3 Austria)	42
Belgian Albums (Ultratop Flanders)	55
Belgian Albums (Ultratop Wallonia)	99
French Physical Albums (SNEP)	57
French Rock & Metal Albums (SNEP)	15
German Albums (Offizielle Top 100)	13
German Rock & Metal Albums (Offizielle Top 100)	5
Japanese Western Albums (Oricon)	23
Swiss Albums (Schweizer Hitparade)	28
UK Independent Albums (OCC)	49
UK Rock & Metal Albums (OCC)	20
US Top Album Sales (Billboard)	15
