= Metal Church =

American heavy metal band

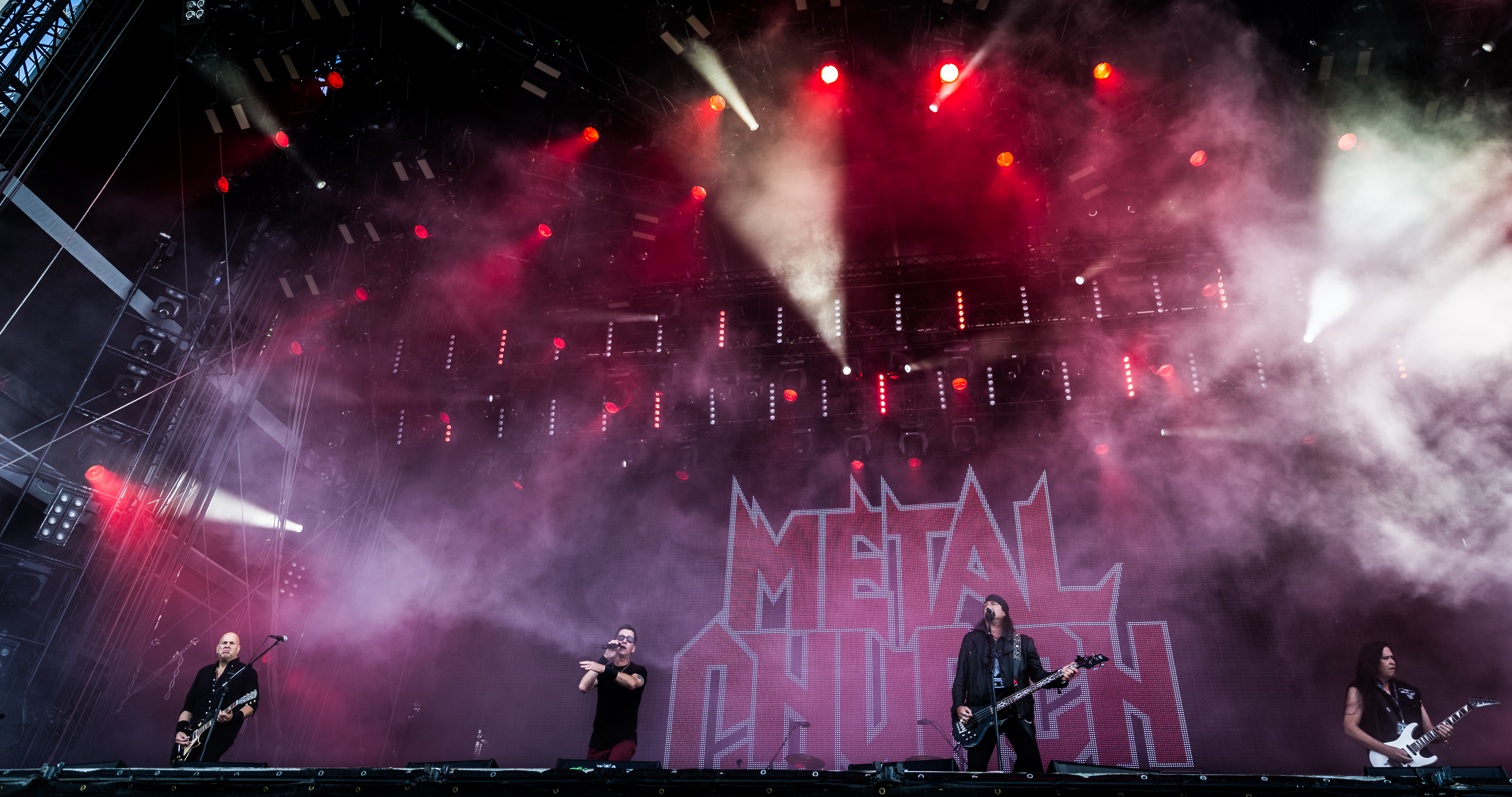
- Metal Church performing at Wacken Open Air in 2016

Background information
- Also known as: Shrapnel (1980–1981)
- Origin: San Francisco, California, U.S.
- Genres: Heavy metal; power metal; thrash metal; speed metal
- Years active: 1980–1996; 1998–2001; 2003–2009; 2012–present
- Labels: Ground Zero; Elektra; Epic; SPV; Nuclear Blast; Mercury; Blackheart; Rat Pak
- Spinoffs: Reverend; Presto Ballet
- Members: Kurdt Vanderhoof; Rick Van Zandt; Brian Allen; David Ellefson; Ken Mary
- Past members: See List of former Metal Church members
- Website: metalchurchofficial.com

Metal Church is an American heavy metal band formed in 1980. Originally based in San Francisco, California, they relocated to Aberdeen, Washington the following year and briefly called themselves Shrapnel. Led by guitarist and songwriter Kurdt Vanderhoof, the band has released fourteen studio albums and is considered to be an integral part of the then-emerging Seattle heavy metal music scene of the 1980s, as well as pioneers of the thrash metal, speed metal and power metal genres. They achieved considerable popularity that decade, with two of their first three albums entering the Top 100 on the U.S. Billboard 200 chart. The band's early lyrical topics, such as conflict and paranoia, later expanded into philosophical, political and social commentary.

Metal Church has had a revolving lineup of vocalists, guitarists, bassists and drummers throughout its 46-year career, and Vanderhoof remains the band's sole consistent creative force, despite reducing his role strictly to composition in 1986 after tiring of performing live. The "classic" lineup of Vanderhoof, vocalist David Wayne, guitarist Craig Wells, bassist Duke Erickson, and drummer Kirk Arrington recorded the band's first two studio albums, Metal Church (1984) and their major breakthrough The Dark (1986). By the end of the 1980s, Vanderhoof and Wayne had parted ways with the band and were replaced by guitarist John Marshall and vocalist Mike Howe, respectively. Metal Church's popularity continued with its third album Blessing in Disguise (1989), which spawned one of their best-known songs "Badlands". After releasing two more studio albums with Howe, The Human Factor (1991) and Hanging in the Balance (1993), the band first disbanded in 1996.

Metal Church reformed in 1998 with most of their "classic" lineup, including Vanderhoof's return to performance, resulting in the band's sixth studio album Masterpeace (1999); however, internal conflicts and Wayne's second departure from the band in 2001 resulted in their second hiatus. Metal Church reunited in 2003, with Ronny Munroe replacing Wayne, and the band underwent a few lineup changes within the next six years, leaving Vanderhoof as the only remaining original member. Following their third disbandment in July 2009, the group reunited for the third time in October 2012, and released their tenth studio album Generation Nothing a year later. Following Munroe's departure in the fall of 2014, Metal Church considered disbanding for the third time before Howe was rehired in April 2015 as their lead singer. He recorded two more albums with the band, which had enjoyed a renewed popularity during the mid-to-late 2010s, before his death on July 26, 2021. Howe was replaced by Marc Lopes, who made his only appearance with Metal Church on their thirteenth studio album Congregation of Annihilation (2023). Another lineup change occurred in 2025, with former Vicious Rumors singer Brian Allen replacing Lopes, and original Megadeth bassist David Ellefson and drummer Ken Mary of Fifth Angel and Flotsam and Jetsam joining the fold.

== History ==
=== Formative years (1980–1984) ===
Then-based in San Francisco, guitarist Kurdt Vanderhoof formed Metal Church in 1980 with various musicians. This era included a brief audition period with future Metallica drummer Lars Ulrich. A three-song, instrumental Red Skies demo, was released in 1981, and featured Vanderhoof, guitarist Rick Condrin, bassist Steve Hott, and drummer Aaron Zimpel.

Vanderhoof relocated to his hometown of Aberdeen in 1981 and began the new group Shrapnel with Craig Wells, Duke Erickson, drummer Tom Weber, and vocalist Mike Murphy. Murphy departed before their next demo, which was recorded without vocals, and Weber departed shortly thereafter. The enlistment of drummer Kirk Arrington and vocalist David Wayne completed the group's classic lineup. They released the demo Four Hymns and spent following years touring and accruing material, readopting the Metal Church moniker in 1983. The song "Death Wish" is featured on the compilation album Northwest Metalfest.

=== First two albums and commercial success (1984–1988) ===
In July 1984, Metal Church released its self-titled debut album, which included three songs from the Four Hymns demo and a cover version of Deep Purple's "Highway Star". They sold 70,000 copies of the album independently before signing to Elektra. According to Wayne, Ulrich and Metallica bandmate James Hetfield urged Elektra to sign the band before another label could.

By the time Metal Church released its second studio album, The Dark, in October 1986, they were touring with high-profile acts including Metallica. The Dark was a commercial success, helped by the fact that the band's first music video, "Watch the Children Pray", received frequent airplay on MTV. As a result, the album managed to enter the US Billboard 200, and saw Metal Church support the album with a world tour that lasted from October 1986 to July 1987, playing with bands such as King Diamond, Celtic Frost, Testament, Overkill, D.R.I., Trouble and, individually, with all of the "Big Four" of thrash metal (Metallica, Megadeth, Slayer and Anthrax).

Shortly after the album's release, however, they were plagued by lineup changes: Vanderhoof ceased performing live with the group in 1986, to be replaced briefly by Mark Baker and more permanently by former Metallica roadie John Marshall. Vanderhoof nonetheless continued to work with the group in composing thereafter, co-writing much of their subsequent material. By the end of 1987, while Metal Church was beginning work on their third album, Wayne was fired from the band due to substance abuse and creative differences with Vanderhoof. He was replaced by former Heretic singer Mike Howe, and later teamed up with the remaining members of Heretic to form Reverend.

=== Further albums and first breakup (1989–1996) ===
With Howe and Marshall, Metal Church released their third studio album, Blessing in Disguise, in 1989. Critics responded favorably to the album, including some assertions that it was the band's strongest effort. Blessing in Disguise was even more successful than its predecessors, peaking at number 75 on the Billboard 200; this was Metal Church's highest chart position, until it was surpassed 27 years later by XI. The album's success was attributed to the music video for "Badlands" getting airplay on MTV's Headbangers Ball, and its opening track "Fake Healer" receiving some attention from mainstream radio stations, most notably KNAC and Z Rock; unlike "Badlands", however, there was no music video for "Fake Healer". After spending most of 1989 and 1990 touring heavily behind Blessing in Disguise (performing with numerous bands such as Metallica, W.A.S.P., Accept, Annihilator, Saxon, Meliah Rage, Forced Entry and D.B.C.), the band had switched labels from Elektra to Epic.

Metal Church released its fourth studio album, and only album on Epic, The Human Factor, in 1991. Critics applauded the group for transitioning to a major label and successfully retaining the vitality of their sound, while also releasing a record with conceptual accessibility beyond the heavy metal genre. While The Human Factor failed to chart on the Billboard 200, it was supported by two successful North American tours, one of which saw Metal Church appear on the Operation Rock & Roll tour (alongside Judas Priest, Alice Cooper, Motörhead and Dangerous Toys), and the band also supported Metallica on select dates of their Wherever We May Roam Tour.

The band followed with their fifth studio album, 1993's Hanging in the Balance, on Mercury Records. After touring almost non-stop in support of that album for about two years, Metal Church officially disbanded for the first time in 1996, citing management problems and poor record sales as factors.

=== Reunion of classic lineup and Masterpeace (1998–2001) ===
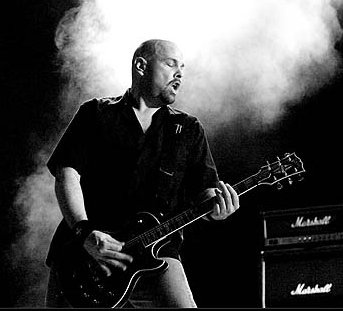
Founding guitarist Kurdt Vanderhoof began performing with the group for the first time in 12 years for their 1998 reformation.

The members of Metal Church began compiling their first live album in 1998, Live, which featured songs from their first two records performed by their classic lineup. During the production of Live, Wayne, Vanderhoof, Wells, Arrington, and Erickson decided to reform the band and began work on a new studio album. Wells was forced to depart the band due to familial obligations, however, and was replaced by the returning Marshall. The live album Live in Japan (recorded on the band's 1995 Japanese tour) was also released in 1998, only in Japan.

The resulting album, Masterpeace, was released in 1999 on Nuclear Blast Records. Critics responded positively, hailing it as a focused product that increased the energy over previous releases, despite it ultimately failing to break new ground. Arrington and Erickson were unable to tour behind the album, so the band enlisted members of Vanderhoof's side projects, bassist Brian Lake and drummer Jeff Wade, for live performances later that year.

Wayne expressed regret regarding Masterpeace, which influenced his musical output that followed. He departed from the band once again in June 2001, due to personal and creative differences, forming the group Wayne with Wells and releasing the curiously titled debut album Metal Church thereafter. Vanderhoof objected to the album's name and cover art; according to Wayne, the purpose of the album's name was to alert the audience of his involvement. Erickson and Marshall also ceased involvement with Metal Church after Wayne's departure, leading to the band's second hiatus.

=== Munroe-led lineup, Wayne's death, and second breakup (2002–2009) ===
Vanderhoof's eponymous band released A Blur in Time in 2002, and he began working on new material for Metal Church's next album thereafter. In following year, he and Arrington recruited singer Ronny Munroe, former Malice guitarist Jay Reynolds, and bassist Steve Unger to form a new lineup of Metal Church. The band's seventh studio album, The Weight of the World, was released in 2004. Critics generally reacted to the record with a lukewarm response, recognizing its accomplishments while noting its lack of consistency and innovation.

On May 9, 2005, former Metal Church singer David Wayne died from gangrene in his legs following a car crash. According to Reverend drummer Todd Stotz, Wayne had suffered from diabetes and leg trouble before the accident.

In 2006, Arrington left the band due to health complications with diabetes. His replacement was Jeff Plate from Savatage, Chris Caffery and the Trans-Siberian Orchestra. Later that year, the band released their eighth studio album, A Light in the Dark, which featured a re-recording of "Watch the Children Pray" as a tribute to Wayne. Vanderhoof said that the tribute was a way of showing fans that he harbored no ill will towards Wayne despite the contentious situation that existed between them before his death.

Reynolds left the group in 2008 and was replaced by Rick Van Zandt. The band's ninth studio album, This Present Wasteland, released that September, which was hailed generally as an effective release consistent with their previous material. After subsequent touring, the band took a hiatus from performing due to Vanderhoof's back problems. They nonetheless continued studio work, while Munroe and Vanderhoof also completed the former's solo album.

After Vanderhoof's health improved, they returned to performing and composing new material. On July 7, 2009, however, the band announced unexpectedly that they were disbanding following a final performance at Rocklahoma two days later, cancelling numerous further live dates. They cited industry frustrations as a major factor influencing the decision. Several former members remained musically active, including Munroe and Vanderhoof in Presto Ballet and Plate in Machines of Grace.

=== Second reformation, Generation Nothing and rotating singers (2012–2015) ===
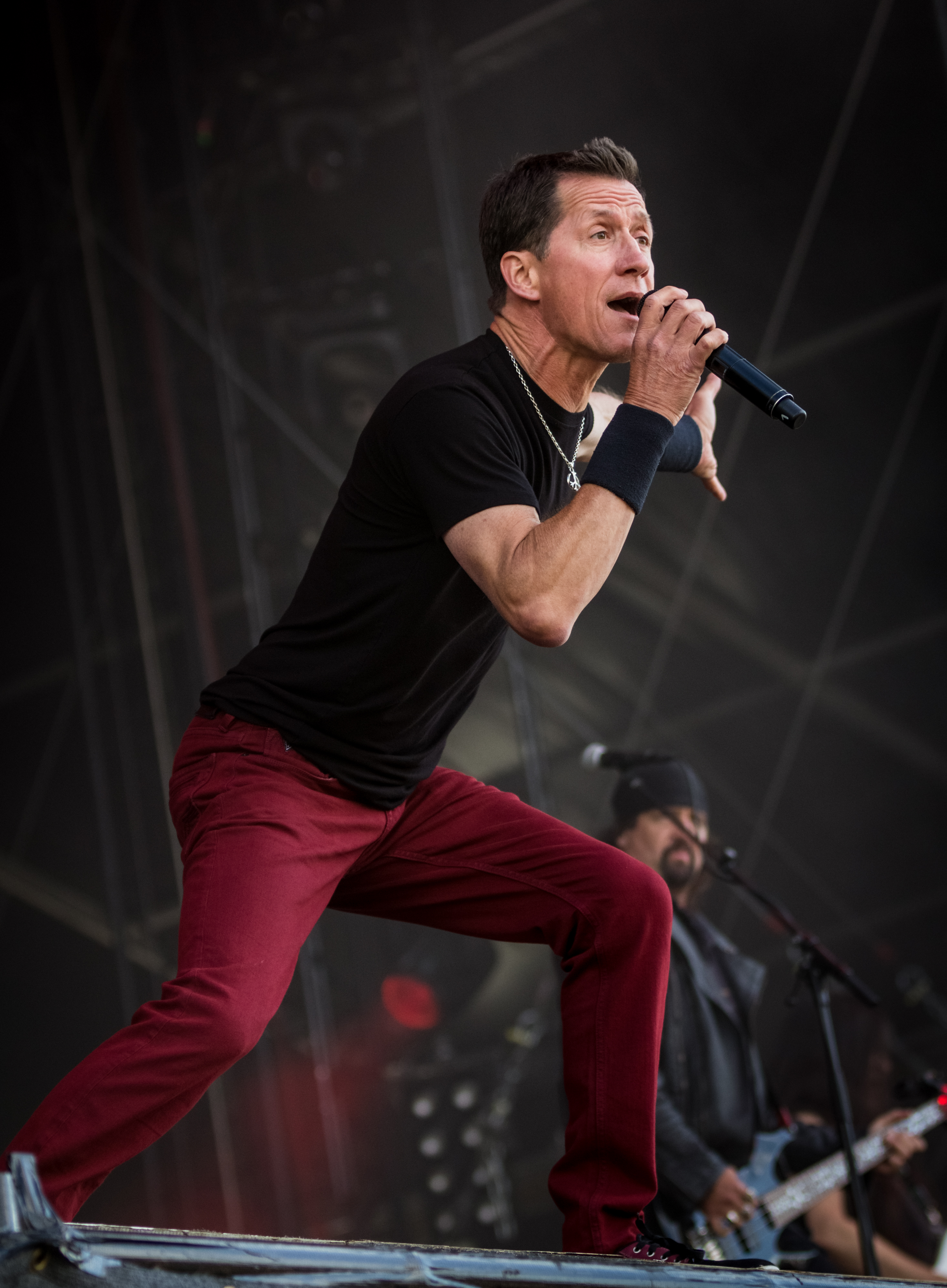
Vocalist Mike Howe, singer for Metal Church from 1988 to 1996, rejoined the group in 2015 and stayed until his death in 2021. His return contributed to Metal Church's resurgence in popularity.

In October 2012, the band announced resumption of activity around a lineup featuring Vanderhoof, Munroe, Unger, Reynolds (soon replaced by Van Zandt), and Plate. Their first performances came the following January during the 70000 Tons of Metal event, a heavy metal cruise. During one of these two shows, the band performed their debut album, Metal Church, in its entirety. Shortly thereafter, Vanderhoof told Music Life Radio that Metal Church had been working on a new album. In order to promote their tenth studio album, the band played festivals in the summer of 2013. The album, Generation Nothing, was released in October.

Munroe left Metal Church in September 2014 to "pursue other interests". The band announced its plans to continue nonetheless. On April 30, 2015, Metal Church announced on their Facebook page that frontman Mike Howe had rejoined the band, nearly two decades after his first departure.

According to Howe, Metal Church was on the verge of disbanding once more before he agreed to rejoin the band. He explained to Spotlight Report in May 2016: "Kurdt Vanderhoof got ahold of me in August of 2014, and he proposed [me] coming back to the band. He said Ronny [Munroe] left the band and he didn't really wanna carry on with Metal Church unless maybe I would consider coming back. So I said, 'Well, I don't know. I'm open to it. But let's see what kind of music we can come up with.' So Kurdt went back to the studio and started writing songs in the vein of Hanging in the Balance, where we left off twenty years ago, and he sent them to me over the Internet. And I was, like, 'Damn! The guy still has it and he's doing great work.' So he sent me another batch, and that batch was just as good [as], if not better than, the other. So, from there, I said, 'Well, I can't say no to this. And let's just see how it goes.' And we started writing lyrics and getting together, and it's morphed into being back in Aberdeen in the studio making the new Metal Church record."

=== XI and Damned If You Do (2016–2020) ===
Metal Church released their eleventh studio album, XI, on March 25, 2016, and it was their first album with Howe on vocals since 1993's Hanging in the Balance. Hailed by some critics as a comeback album, XI received positive reviews from critics, and was Metal Church's first album in 27 years (since Blessing in Disguise) to enter the Billboard 200; the album peaked at number 57, making it the band's highest chart position in their career. On the album's supporting tour, guitarist Rick Van Zandt had to go in for emergency eye surgery to repair a detached retina, and was temporarily replaced by former Firewolfe guitarist Paul Kleff, and Savatage guitarist Chris Caffery. The band co-headlined a West Coast North American tour with Armored Saint in June 2016, and along with Amon Amarth, Suicidal Tendencies and Butcher Babies, they supported Megadeth on the latter's U.S. Dystopia tour in September–October 2016.

When asked in October 2016 if he had intended to write another album with Metal Church, Howe stated, "We have every intention of doing that and that's what it's all about. If you're not putting on new music, then it's time to go away for me. In Metal Church... it's always been like a two-year cycle band, but we put our album out this year in March. So our album is actually only being out for six months. But we have plans on this fall getting back to writing and try to put something out next year. We're also looking at some dates for the spring possibly back in the States and maybe back over here. But our drummer Jeff, he's also on the TSO. He leaves from the end of October through December. So we might take that time to start writing new record."

Metal Church released a live album, titled Classic Live, on April 28, 2017. Recorded on the 2016 XI tour, it was the band's first live album since 1998's Live in Japan, and their only live album with Howe on vocals.

On March 21, 2017, drummer Jeff Plate announced his departure from Metal Church. As the result of his departure, the band withdrew from a North American tour with Alter Bridge and In Flames that was scheduled to take place in May 2017. Plate was replaced by former W.A.S.P. drummer Stet Howland.

In a May 2017 interview, Vanderhoof stated that Metal Church had begun writing and demoing their twelfth studio album, which was tentatively due for release in early 2018.

On October 1, 2018, Metal Church teased an audio sample of a song from their twelfth studio album. The album, Damned If You Do, was announced shortly after and it was released on December 7, 2018. In support of Damned If You Do, Metal Church co-headlined a North American tour with Doro in April–May 2019, and performed at Megadeth's first-ever Megacruise that October.

In a July 2019 interview with Italy's Metalforce, Howe said that Metal Church would likely begin writing new material in 2020. Vanderhoof stated in an interview with Metal Wani in April 2020 that Metal Church would "probably start writing that later in the summer." He concluded, "We're gonna sit and we're gonna wait till there's a new album, and then we'll go out and do the normal promoting it or backing it up by touring and playing shows. But we're gonna wait till there's a new record."

Metal Church released their first compilation album From the Vault on April 10, 2020. It contains four new studio tracks, five B-side tracks from the Damned If You Do sessions, three song covers and two tracks culled from their performance at Club Citta in Kawasaki, Japan. The band stated on their Facebook page in July 2021 that their thirteenth studio album would be released in 2022.

=== Howe's death, arrival of Marc Lopes and Congregation of Annihilation (2021–2024) ===
On July 26, 2021, Metal Church announced Howe had died that morning at his home in Eureka, California, at the age of 55. His death was ruled to be a suicide by hanging. In October 2021, after announcing the return of his short-lived early 1990s band Hall Aflame, Vanderhoof hinted on his Facebook page that Metal Church would continue on with a yet-to-be-revealed replacement for Howe. A month later, drummer Stet Howland revealed that he and the remaining members of the band had started to "communicate again" following Howe's death. Although he did not specify the current state of Metal Church, Howland declared, "We're all slowly digesting. We just started talking again a few weeks ago, and we're barely talking about anything except making jokes, and we have our banter, we're starting to joke and communicated again together. Building on the future will come, but right now... we're just like hugging right now, we're all like 'I love you, man'. That's kind of where we're at. I know everybody wants to know more, when there's more you'll hear about it." By mid-2022, rumors had circulated that Ronny Munroe would rejoin the band, but resulted in him joining Vicious Rumors.

In a September 2022 interview with Metal Rules, Vanderhoof revealed that the band had found a replacement in Howe, but added that they were "keeping a lid" on the identity of their new singer "for the time being." He also revealed that a new Metal Church album, which they had begun writing just before Howe's death, would be released in 2023. The band played one of their first shows in four years at Belgium's Alcatraz Open Air in August 2023.

On February 2, 2023, Metal Church announced Marc Lopes as their new lead vocalist. A month later, the band announced that their thirteenth album, Congregation of Annihilation, would be released on May 26. Four days prior to the album's release, former Metal Church drummer Kirk Arrington died at the age of 61. The band supported Congregation of Annihilation with a world tour, including a series of headlining tours in North America and Australia; Metal Church was scheduled to North America again in the spring of 2024, but it was cancelled due to Vanderhoof's "ongoing back issue." A live album featuring Howe's final live performances, The Final Sermon (Live in Japan 2019), was released on July 26, 2024 to coincide with the third anniversary of his death.

An authorized book by author James R. Beach and co-author and archivist Brian L. Naron, Beyond the Black: The Story of Metal Church, was released in November 2023. In addition to past and present members of Metal Church, the book includes interviews with the band's road crew members, record producers and contemporaries, and a foreword by former Grim Reaper guitarist Nick Bowcott.

In a December 2023 interview with Metal Wani, Lopes stated that Metal Church would begin working on new material for their fourteenth studio album in late 2024.

=== New lineup and Dead to Rights (2025–present) ===
When asked in January 2025 about the status of Metal Church, Lopes said, "I don't know anything about nothing. It was doing amazing, everything was going really good, and then stuff happens. [Laughs] I haven't heard from anybody in a long time. That happens. People sometimes, they've gotta go do their thing. So I don't know. I don't know. I have no idea… There's nothing to hide. I don't know anything. You know what I mean?"

On November 21, 2025, Metal Church announced that they had parted ways with Lopes, bassist Steve Unger and drummer Stet Howland, who were replaced by former Vicious Rumors frontman Brian Allen, original Megadeth bassist David Ellefson, and drummer Ken Mary of Fifth Angel and Flotsam and Jetsam, respectively. This new lineup recorded the band's upcoming fourteenth studio album, which was set for release in 2026. The album's first single "F.A.F.O." was released the same day as the announcement. The resulting album, titled Dead to Rights, was released on April 10, 2026. The lineup of the album performed its first show together at the San Luis Metal Fest at Teatro del Pueblo in San Luis Potosí, Mexico on May 17, 2026. Metal Church toured in support of Dead to Rights, including touring with Heathen and All Sinners on the East Coast of the United States, opening for Testament in Europe, and co-headlined a North American tour with Armored Saint twice, with the first leg taking place in November 2026 and second to take place in March and April 2027.

A new live recording, Live at Rock Hard 2026, was released on October 9, 2026 through MIG (Made in Germany Music), with the consent of guitarist Kurdt Vanderhoof. Released both as a live album and a live DVD, it contains the band's performance at the Rock Hard Festival from 2016 in its entirety.

A few months after the release of Dead to Rights, Ellefson confirmed that Metal Church plans to work on new material for their next album in 2027.

== Musical style ==
Metal Church is considered one of the pioneers of the thrash metal genre. Steve Huey of AllMusic claimed the band's first two albums, Metal Church and The Dark, "made a huge splash" on the 1980s thrash/speed metal scene. According to Screamer Magazine, "Initially playing an abrasive and fast rendition of the NWOBHM sound, they released a few demos which sounded not too dissimilar to what Metallica will later popularize as thrash metal." Cool Cleveland called them "one of the earliest thrash metal bands" from the Pacific Northwest and "a reliable and welcome presence on the metal circuit", while RockLists.com referred to the band as "a cornerstone of the Seattle area's fledgling heavy metal scene."

By the time of their third album Blessing in Disguise, Metal Church's music had started to become more technical and melodic, mixing their thrash and speed metal sounds with elements and influences from a variety of musical styles, including progressive metal, power metal, and traditional heavy metal; this mixture of those genres would continue on many of the band's subsequent albums.

== Members ==
Current

- Kurdt Vanderhoof – rhythm guitar, keyboards (1980–1986, 1998–2001, 2003–2009, 2012–present)
- Rick Van Zandt – lead guitar (2008–2009, 2012–present)
- Brian Allen – lead vocals (2025–present)
- David Ellefson – bass, backing vocals (2025–present)
- Ken Mary – drums, percussion (2025–present)

== Discography ==
Studio albums

- Metal Church (1984)
- The Dark (1986)
- Blessing in Disguise (1989)
- The Human Factor (1991)
- Hanging in the Balance (1993)
- Masterpeace (1999)
- The Weight of the World (2004)
- A Light in the Dark (2006)
- This Present Wasteland (2008)
- Generation Nothing (2013)
- XI (2016)
- Damned If You Do (2018)
- Congregation of Annihilation (2023)
- Dead to Rights (2026)

Live albums

- Live (1998)
- Live in Japan (1998)
- Classic Live (2017)
- Final Sermon - Live in Japan 2019 (2024)
- Live at Rock Hard 2016 (2026)

Compilation albums

- From the Vault (2020)

Demos

- Red Skies (1981)
- Hitman (1983)
- Four Hymns (1983)

Singles

- "Gods of Wrath" (1985)
- "Start the Fire" (1986)
- "Watch the Children Pray" (1986)
- "Iron Man" (1988) (with Sir Mix-a-Lot)
- "Badlands" (1989)
- "Fake Healer" (1989)
- "Date with Poverty" (1991)
- "In Harm's Way" (1991)
- "In Mourning" (1991)
- "The Human Factor" (1991)
- "Gods of Second Chance" (1993)
- "Mirror of Lies" (2006)
- "No Tomorrow" (2016)
- "Killing Your Time" (2016)
- "Reset" (2016)
- "Needle and Suture" (2016)
- "Fake Healer" (2017) (with Todd La Torre)
- "Damned If You Do" (2018)
- "By the Numbers" (2018)
- "Pick a God and Prey" (2023)
- "Making Monsters" (2023)
- "F.A.F.O." (2025)
- "Brainwash Game" (2026)
