= The Dark (Metal Church album) =

Studio album by Metal Church
- Released: October 6, 1986
- Recorded: 1985–1986
- Studios: Steve Lawson Productions, Seattle, Washington
- Genres: Thrash metal; heavy metal; power metal; speed metal
- Length: 42:12
- Label: Elektra/Asylum
- Producer: Mark Dodson

Metal Church chronology
Metal Church (1984)	The Dark (1986)	Blessing in Disguise (1989)

Singles from The Dark
- 1. "Start the Fire" Released: October 8, 1986; 2. "Watch the Children Pray" Released: 1986

The Dark is the second full-length album released by American heavy metal band Metal Church, released on October 6, 1986. This was the last album featuring the group's "classic" lineup of David Wayne, Kurdt Vanderhoof, Kirk Arrington, Duke Erickson, and Craig Wells, until Masterpeace (1999), which reunited the four-fifths of that lineup, with John Marshall replacing Wells.

It is considered an essential release in the thrash metal genre.

== Album information ==
The Dark talks of somber themes, such as assassination, death, struggle, rituals, and the supernatural: the lyrics from "Line of Death", for example, were based on Libyan hostilities in the Gulf of Sidra, while the band's title track involves the protagonist attempting to survive the night in an abandoned house with an evil, demonic entity stalking and attempting to drag him to hell. "Watch the Children Pray" became the band's power ballad music video. The album was dedicated to the late Metallica bassist Cliff Burton, who died nine days before its release. In order to promote The Dark, Metal Church supported Metallica and Anthrax on the Damage, Inc. Tour. They also opened for Megadeth, Anthrax and King Diamond.

"Ton of Bricks" appears in the Charlie Sheen movie No Man's Land.

Anthrax guitarist Scott Ian has been quoted as saying that Mark Dodson's production work on this album inspired the band to work with him as the producer for their fourth album State of Euphoria (1988).

== Critical and commercial reception ==
Professional ratings
Review scores
Source	Rating
AllMusic	2.5/5 stars
Collector's Guide to Heavy Metal	7/10
Kerrang!	4/5 stars
Rock Hard	9/10

Contemporary reviews for The Dark were mostly positive. Paul Miller of Kerrang! wrote that the passage to a major label inevitably compromised Metal Church's sound for "mass commercial acceptability", with the result that The Dark was not "as solidly hefty" as their "monstrously brilliant debut". However, the album was judged "impressive", revealing of a new side of the band in the heavy metal ballad "Watch the Children Pray" and riding "a delicate balance of semi-Speed and lightweight material". Rock Hard reviewer suspected that Metal Church had reached the peak of their creativity on their debut album and considered The Dark a little inferior, criticizing vocalist David Wayne's performance to the point of wishing that a personnel change would happen.

Modern reviews are more critical. AllMusic's Eduardo Rivadavia states that the album shows a band "struggling with their direction and wrestling with internal problems" and, although its "first half contained some of the group's best material", its "second half pretty much stalls after the moderately interesting title track." Canadian journalist Martin Popoff describes the album as "one half a very good record, one half filler" and Metal Church as a band "making solid cutting-edge metal that invariably sounded harsh, bitter and self-defeated". He also reveals in his review that the band now sees the album as "woefully over-produced".

In 2005, the album was ranked number 389 in Rock Hard magazine's book The 500 Greatest Rock & Metal Albums of All Time.

The Dark entered the Billboard 200 chart on January 24, 1987. The album itself peaked at number 92 (their third-highest chart position as of 2021, behind XI and Blessing in Disguise, which entered at number 57 and number 75, respectively) and remained on the chart for 23 weeks.

== Track listing ==
All tracks are written by David Wayne, Kurdt Vanderhoof and Craig Wells, unless otherwise noted.

Side one
No.	Title	Writer(s)	Length
1.	"Ton of Bricks"	Wayne, Vanderhoof, Wells, Duke Erickson, Kirk Arrington	2:55
2.	"Start the Fire"		3:55
3.	"Method to Your Madness"	Wayne, Vanderhoof, Wells, Mark Dodson	4:52
4.	"Watch the Children Pray"		5:57
5.	"Over My Dead Body"		3:36

Side two
No.	Title	Writer(s)	Length
6.	"The Dark"		4:11
7.	"Psycho"	Wayne, Vanderhoof, Wells, Arrington	3:32
8.	"Line of Death"	Wayne, Vanderhoof, Wells, Erickson, Arrington	4:42
9.	"Burial at Sea"		4:58
10.	"Western Alliance"		3:18

== Personnel ==
Metal Church

- David Wayne – vocals
- Craig Wells – lead guitar
- Kurdt Vanderhoof – rhythm guitar
- Duke Erickson – bass
- Kirk Arrington – drums, percussion

Production

- Mark Dodson – producer, engineer, mixing, arrangements with Metal Church
- Terry Date – engineer
- George Marino – mastering at Sterling Sound, New York

== Charts ==
Chart (1986)	Peak position
US Billboard 200	92
