= Damned If You Do =

Damned If You Do may refer to:

- "Damned If You Do" (House) (2004), an episode of the American TV series House
- "Damned If You Do" (NCIS) (2013), an episode of the American TV series NCIS
- "Damned If You Do..." (2015), an episode of the American TV series Gotham
- Damned If You Do (album) (2018), an album by American heavy metal band Metal Church
