= Vanderhoof =

Vanderhoof may refer to:

== Places ==
- Vanderhoof, British Columbia, district municipality in British Columbia, Canada

== People ==
- John D. Vanderhoof (1922–2013), American banker and politician
- Kurdt Vanderhoof (born 1961), American heavy metal musician
