= The Human Factor (album) =

Studio album by Metal Church
- Released: March 26, 1991
- Recorded: 1990
- Studio: Devonshire Studios, (Burbank, California)
- Genre: Heavy metal; power metal; thrash metal
- Length: 51:15
- Label: Epic
- Producer: Mark Dodson

Metal Church chronology
| Blessing in Disguise (1989) | The Human Factor (1991) | Hanging in the Balance (1993) |

The Human Factor is the fourth album by American heavy metal band Metal Church, released in 1991. It was the band's only release on Epic Records.

== Reception ==
Professional ratings
Review scores
| Source | Rating |
|---|---|
| AllMusic | 4.5/5 stars |
| Collector's Guide to Heavy Metal | 10/10 |
| Rock Hard | 9/10 |

Reviews for The Human Factor have been generally positive. In a contemporary review, Rock Hard elected The Human Factor "power metal highlight of the month" and valued its sound "rounder and more energetic than Blessing in Disguise", praising all musicians and singer Mike Howe in particular. AllMusic's Alex Henderson wrote that "much of the writing is quite substantial, and Metal Church tackles social and political subjects with inspired results on songs ranging from 'Date with Poverty' and 'Flee from Reality' to 'The Final Word' (which addresses the flag-burning controversy of 1991 and asserts that the U.S., whatever its faults, is still the best place to live)." Canadian journalist Martin Popoff considered the album the band's masterwork and put Metal Church on a par with Megadeth as "metal perfection personified". He praised the "maturity and sensitivity" of the lyrics, Mark Dodson's production and Mike Howe's performance, defining the songs "without exception infectious and unstoppable."

Although The Human Factor sold well at the time of its release, it turned out to be one of Metal Church's least successful albums, not appearing on any album charts. In order to promote The Human Factor, Metal Church supported Motörhead, Judas Priest, Dangerous Toys and Alice Cooper on the Operation Rock & Roll tour, and later supported Metallica on the Wherever We May Roam Tour.

In 2005, the album was ranked number 447 in Rock Hard magazine's book The 500 Greatest Rock & Metal Albums of All Time.

== Track listing ==
| No. | Title | Writer(s) | Length |
|---|---|---|---|
| 1. | "Human Factor" | Mike Howe, Kurdt Vanderhoof | 5:00 |
| 2. | "Date with Poverty" | Howe, Vanderhoof | 5:20 |
| 3. | "The Final Word" | Howe, Vanderhoof | 6:00 |
| 4. | "In Mourning" | Howe, John Marshall, Vanderhoof, Craig Wells | 6:00 |
| 5. | "In Harm's Way" | Marshall, Vanderhoof | 7:00 |
| 6. | "In Due Time" | Howe, Marshall, Vanderhoof, Wells, Kirk Arrington | 4:04 |
| 7. | "Agent Green" | Howe, Vanderhoof | 5:58 |
| 8. | "Flee from Reality" | Howe, Marshall, Wells | 4:13 |
| 9. | "Betrayed" | Howe, Vanderhoof | 4:32 |
| 10. | "The Fight Song" | Howe, Marshall, Wells, Duke Erickson, Arrington | 3:24 |

== Personnel ==
Metal Church

- Mike Howe – vocals
- Craig Wells – lead guitar
- John Marshall – rhythm guitar
- Duke Erickson – bass
- Kirk Arrington – drums

Additional musicians

- Kurdt Vanderhoof – additional guitars

Production

- Mark Dodson – producer, engineer, arrangements with Kurdt Vanderhoof and Metal Church
- Tom Fletcher – mixing
- Greg Calbi – mastering at Sterling Sound, New York
- Kenny Laguna – management
- Christopher Austopchuk, Francesca Restrepo – art direction
- Max Aguilera-Hellweg – photography
