= Live (Metal Church album) =

Live album by Metal Church
- Released: 1998
- Recorded: 1986
- Genre: Thrash metal
- Length: 45:59
- Label: Nuclear Blast America (US); SPV/Steamhammer (Europe)
- Producer: Metal Church

Metal Church chronology
Hanging in the Balance (1993)	Live (1998)	Masterpeace (1999)

Professional ratings
Review scores
Source	Rating
AllMusic	3/5 stars
Collector's Guide to Heavy Metal	6/10

Live is the first (and until 2017 the only) live album of heavy metal band Metal Church. The tracks were recorded at various locations during 1986 by the first Metal Church line-up and shelved for many years with little documentation about their origin. Only the track "Start the Fire" was previously released in the late 1980s, albeit with a different mix and possible studio treatment, on a compilation album called Time to Rock.

== Track listing ==
No.	Title	Writer(s)	Length
1.	"Ton of Bricks"	David Wayne, Craig Wells, Kurdt Vanderhoof, Duke Erickson, Kirk Arrington	2:51
2.	"Hitman"	Wells, Vanderhoof	4:16
3.	"Start the Fire"	Wayne, Wells, Vanderhoof	3:53
4.	"Gods of Wrath"	Wayne, Wells, Vanderhoof	6:27
5.	"The Dark"	Wayne, Wells, Vanderhoof	3:52
6.	"Psycho"	Wayne, Wells, Vanderhoof, Arrington	3:28
7.	"Watch the Children Pray"	Wayne, Wells, Vanderhoof	5:34
8.	"Beyond the Black"	Wayne, Wells, Vanderhoof	6:31
9.	"Metal Church"	Wayne, Wells, Vanderhoof	4:35
10.	"Highway Star" (Deep Purple cover)	Ian Gillan, Ritchie Blackmore, Roger Glover, Jon Lord, Ian Paice	4:32

== Personnel ==
Metal Church

- David Wayne - vocals
- Kurdt Vanderhoof - guitar, mixing
- Craig Wells - guitar
- Duke Erickson - bass guitar
- Kirk Arrington - drums

Production

- Mark Greer - mastering
- Eric Peacock - design, cover art
