= Presto Ballet =

- Origin: Aberdeen, Washington, United States
- Genres: Progressive rock
- Years active: 2005-present
- Labels: Rat Pak Records; Body of Work Recordings
- Members: Scott Albright; Kurdt Vanderhoof; Bobby Ferkovich; Kerry Shacklett; Charlie Lorme
- Past members: Jeff Wade; Brian Cokeley; Brian Lake; Chuck Campbell; Bill Raymond; Izzy Rehaume; Ryan McPherson

Presto Ballet is a progressive rock band founded by Metal Church guitarist Kurdt Vanderhoof. Their sound is highly reminiscent of 1970s prog rock, as the band was founded chiefly as a tribute to classic progressive bands such as Yes and Kansas.

== History ==
Presto Ballet's debut album Peace Among the Ruins was released in 2005 to general praise. Critics commented on the album's warm and organic sound, a feeling created through the use of analogue recorders and vintage instruments. The band used no drum machines, digital recorders or sequencers in the studio.

The Lost Art of Time Travel was released on ProgRock Records in June 2008, featuring a revamped lineup.

Presto Ballet's third album, Invisible Places, was released on February 4, 2011, through SAOL / H'Art / Zebralution. On this release, founder Kurdt Vanderhoof was joined by fellow Metal Church alum Ronny Munroe on vocals, keyboardist Kerry Shacklett (Craig Chaquico), and bassist Bobby Ferkovich (Pamela Moore, ex-Heir Apparent). Drums on the new album were handled by session man Henry Ellwood.

2011 also saw the self-release of the EP Love What You've Done to the Place with the same line-up. Drums were again done by Henry Ellwood, even though Jeffrey McCormack was credited on the album.

In 2012, the band released Relic of the Modern World on Body of Work Recordings. Line-up changes for this record included Chuck Campbell joining the band and replacing Ronny Munroe on vocals, and Larry Crowe played drums on the recording. Prior to the playing shows in support of the record, Charlie Lorme joined as the permanent drummer, completing what has been the most stable line-up in the band's history.

Eventually the band was picked up by Metal Church's label Rat Pak Records, and released The Days Between on December 14, 2018. The line-up remained intact for this record, which the band feels is their strongest effort yet.

== Members ==
Current members

- Kurdt Vanderhoof - Guitar, mellotron, chamberlin, synthesizer, Hammond organ, bass pedals, electric piano
- Scott Albright - Lead vocals, acoustic guitar
- Bobby Ferkovich - Bass, backing vocals, Taurus pedals
- Kerry Shacklett - Piano, keyboards, Hammond organ, backing vocals
- Charlie Lorme - Drums, percussion

Former members

- Ronny Munroe - Lead vocals, acoustic guitar
- Jeff Wade - Drums, percussion
- Brian Cokeley - Piano, Hammond organ, synthesizer, electric piano, lead and backing vocals
- Brian Lake - Bass
- Chuck Campbell - Lead vocals
- Ryan McPherson - Piano, keyboards, Hammond organ.
- Izzy Rehaume - Bass
- Bill Raymond - Drums
- Larry Crowe - Drums

== Discography ==
Studio albums

- Peace Among the Ruins (2005)
- The Lost Art of Time Travel (2008)
- Invisible Places (2011)
- Relic of the Modern World (2012)
- The Days Between (2018)
- Dreamentia (2025)

EPs

- Love What You've Done with the Place (2011)
