= Live at the Key Club =

Live at the Key Club may refer to:

- Live @ the Key Club, a 2000 album by Pennywise
- Live at the Key Club (Cinderella album)
- The Sting: Live at the Key Club L.A.
- Against Me!: Live at the Key Club, a live concert DVD featuring the band Against Me!
