= Ronny Munroe =

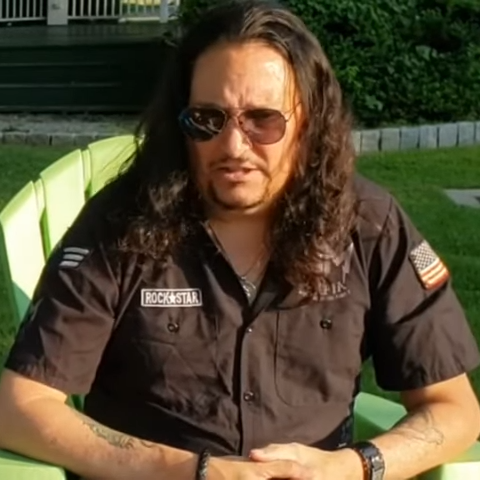
- Munroe in 2021

Background information
- Born: November 22, 1965 (age 60); Tacoma, Washington, U.S.
- Genres: Heavy metal; thrash metal; progressive rock; hard rock
- Occupation: Singer

Ronny Munroe (born November 22, 1965) is an American singer, most noted as the lead vocalist of the heavy metal band Metal Church from 2003 until the band broke up in 2009. His second tenure with the band lasted from 2012 when the group reunited until 2014, where he left to "pursue other interests". He also had a brief stint as the vocalist for Lillian Axe. He was also the lead singer of progressive rock band Presto Ballet. In October 2011 Munroe joined the Trans-Siberian Orchestra, as a vocalist. In 2022, Munroe became the lead vocalist of Vicious Rumors. and Munroe's Thunder Project in 2016

== Biography ==
Munroe was the lead singer for the band Zero Discipline then onto lead vocals for the band Madhouse. Munroe's first position as a vocalist was with the band Moxi. He was the lead vocalist for the Seattle band Paladin from 1986 to 1988. He was also in FarCry in the early nineties. Munroe was with the Seattle band Rottweiller when he was asked to audition for Kurdt Vanderhoof for a project he was working on. It was during that audition that Kurdt decided to resurrect Metal Church with Munroe as their frontman. Ronny recorded three albums with Metal Church before the band called it quits in 2009. In 2010, Ronny joined up with Kurdt in his progressive rock band Presto Ballet, releasing the Invisible Places album and the follow-up EP Love What You've Done with the Place. In October 2011 Ronny joined the Trans-Siberian Orchestra as a vocalist for their Fall/Winter tour.

Ronny Munroe studied voice under David Kyle, who also taught Ann and Nancy Wilson of Heart, Chris Cornell of Soundgarden and Audioslave, Geoff Tate of Queensrÿche, Layne Staley of Alice in Chains and Metal Church singers David Wayne and Mike Howe, respectively. Munroe is best known for his broad vocal range and power and his ability to capture his audiences' attention.

Munroe released the Internal Quest EP in 2007 and released his full-length debut The Fire Within on April 20, 2009. Ronny released his third solo album Lords of the Edge on October 11, 2011. Lords of the Edge includes contributions from guitarist Chris Caffery, who also wrote Rock in a Hard Place for the album. Also playing on this record are guitarists Rick Van Zandt, Stu Marshall and Michael Wilton.

In 2014 Munroe released his third solo album, Electric Wake.

In December 2015 Munroe along with his Manager/partner, J Von Hughes (Joy E Anderson), founded "Munroe's Thunder" and a full length record is in the works. The band members are: Ronny Munroe (vocals), David Mark Pearce (guitar), Justin Zych (guitar), Chris Tristram (bass), and Rick Ward (drums). Original bassist RC Ciejek left in March 2016.

In 2018, Munroe formed a supergroup, the band being called Peacemaker. The band's debut album Concrete and Terror will be released in September. In 2022 is announced that the singer joins Us metal veterans Vicious Rumors, In 2024, Munroe joined forces with Leon Sohail of Offensive to work on a set of covers for live performances. Under the name, Project Leo, Munroe and Sohail performed 6 shows in April of 2024 celebrating the 3 decades of metal. Songs performed during Project Leo performances include classics from Metallica, Iron Maiden, Black Sabbath, and Munroe's old band, Metal Church.

In 2024, Roberto Palacios from the german band Cave, who knows Munroe from some shows from his former band with METAL CHURCH decided to ask him to join. After listening to the demos Monroe immediately decided to join the band.

== Discography ==
Founded Munroe's Thunder (2015)

=== With Metal Church ===
- The Weight of the World (2004)
- A Light in the Dark (2006)
- This Present Wasteland (2008)
- Generation Nothing (2013)

=== With Presto Ballet ===
- Invisible Places (2010)
- Love What You've Done with the Place (EP) (2011)

=== With Cave ===
- Out of the Cave (2024)

=== Solo ===
- Internal Quest (EP) (2007)
- The Fire Within (2009)
- Lords of the Edge (2011)
- Electric Wake (2014)
