= This Present Wasteland =

Studio album by Metal Church
- Released: September 23, 2008
- Studio: The English Channel Studio (Olympia, Washington)
- Genre: Heavy metal; thrash metal
- Length: 57:21
- Label: SPV/Steamhammer
- Producer: Kurdt Vanderhoof

Metal Church chronology
| A Light in the Dark (2006) | This Present Wasteland (2008) | Generation Nothing (2013) |

This Present Wasteland is the ninth studio album by American heavy metal band Metal Church. The album was released in the US on September 23, 2008, and in Europe on September 26. This is the first album to feature guitarist Rick Van Zandt.

This Present Wasteland sold about 920 copies in the US in the week following its release. This was their last album before their second breakup from July 2009 to October 2012.

The album cover was chosen from contest entries submitted on Myspace.

== Reception ==
Professional ratings
Review scores
| Source | Rating |
|---|---|
| AllMusic | 3.5/5 stars |
| Metal Storm | 7.5/10 |
| Rock Hard | 6/10 |

AllMusic reviewer Alex Henderson stated that, while the album was not "essential", it was "a solid and well-executed effort" by the band, singling out "Breathe Again", "Monster", "A War Never Won" and "Company of Sorrow" in particular as standout tracks on the album. Metal Storm reviewer found the album solid and "extremely pleasant but not sensational", because Metal Church did not "take any risk with this new release" and kept the songs "really simple and not original." Exclaim! reviewer Keith Carman praised Ronny Munroe's performance which he compared to Bruce Dickinson's, but found the music old-fashioned and "mired in more crooning, stock riffs and mid-tempo beats than anything truly engaging", concluding that "This Present Wasteland is a fitting moniker for a band living off nostalgia more than current ability." Rock Hard reviewer called the current line-up "only a shadow of the aggressive quintet of the past" and remarked the scarce originality of the compositions and the pessimistic mood of the album.

== Track listing ==
All tracks are written by Ronny Munroe and Kurdt Vanderhoof, except "Monster" by Vanderhoof.

| No. | Title | Length |
|---|---|---|
| 1. | "The Company of Sorrow" | 6:37 |
| 2. | "The Perfect Crime" | 4:37 |
| 3. | "Deeds of a Dead Soul" | 8:27 |
| 4. | "Meet Your Maker" | 5:35 |
| 5. | "Monster" | 6:25 |
| 6. | "Crawling to Extinction" | 4:11 |
| 7. | "A War Never Won" | 5:33 |
| 8. | "Mass Hysteria" | 4:41 |
| 9. | "Breathe Again" | 5:23 |
| 10. | "Congregation" | 5:52 |

== Personnel ==
Metal Church

- Ronny Munroe – lead vocals
- Rick Van Zandt – lead guitar
- Kurdt Vanderhoof – rhythm guitar, Mellotron, Minimoog, producer, engineer, mixing
- Steve Unger – bass, backing vocals
- Jeff Plate – drums, percussion

Guest musicians

- Angus Clark – guitar solo on "Monster"
- Chris Caffery – guitar solo on "Mass Hysteria"
- Matt Leff – guitar solo on "Congregation"
