= Generation Nothing =

Studio album by Metal Church
- Released: October 22, 2013
- Recorded: March–June 2013
- Studio: The English Channel (Olympia, Washington)
- Genre: Heavy metal; thrash metal
- Length: 52:54
- Label: Body of Work / Rat Pack
- Producer: Kurdt Vanderhoof

Metal Church chronology
| This Present Wasteland (2008) | Generation Nothing (2013) | XI (2016) |

Generation Nothing is the tenth studio album by American heavy metal band Metal Church. It is their first after their late 2012 reunion, and their fourth and last to feature vocalist Ronny Munroe.

== Background ==
In 2009, Vanderhoof disbanded the band following the release of This Present Wasteland and their final performance at Rocklahoma that year. In 2012, it was announced that the band was reuniting for two shows on the 70000 Tons of Metal cruise. Ultimately, the band decided to stay together.

On July 12, 2013 the album title was revealed.

== Composition and recording ==
The band entered Kurdt Vanderhoof's English Channel studio in March 2013 to start work on the album. Vanderhoof started mixing the album in mid June 2013. Generation Nothing was released on October 22, 2013 on Vanderhoof's label, Body of Work Recordings.

Singer Ronny Munroe noted: "Generation Nothing is kind of a sad state out there for the youth now that they do not have the things that we used to have when I was growing up."

== Reception ==
Professional ratings
Review scores
| Source | Rating |
|---|---|
| Blabbermouth.net | 8/10 |
| Jukebox:Metal | 2.5/5 stars |
| BraveWords | 7.5/10 |

Generation Nothing received mixed reviews. Ken Morton of Highwire Daze praised the album, opining that it would both "impress the old school fans" and "gain this influential band a whole new set of converts ready to join the congregation." Ray Van Horn Jr. of Blabbermouth described the title track as "a headstrong beast of a cut," adding that much of the album "sticks to a straightforward power metal drive with heaps of resounding guitar intros and dense plods." He also judged the album "an agreeable career extension for Metal Church."

== Track listing ==
All lyrics are written by Kurdt Vanderhoof, except where indicated; all music is composed by Vanderhoof.

| No. | Title | Lyrics | Length |
|---|---|---|---|
| 1. | "Bulletproof" | | 4:08 |
| 2. | "Dead City" | | 3:45 |
| 3. | "Generation Nothing" | | 5:03 |
| 4. | "Noises in the Wall" | | 8:55 |
| 5. | "Jump the Gun" | Vanderhoof, Ronny Munroe | 5:35 |
| 6. | "Suiciety" | Vanderhoof, Munroe | 5:42 |
| 7. | "Scream" | | 4:22 |
| 8. | "Hits Keep Comin'" | Munroe | 5:36 |
| 9. | "Close to the Bone" | | 4:41 |
| 10. | "The Media Horse" | Munroe | 5:07 |

Japanese edition bonus track
| No. | Title | Length |
|---|---|---|
| 11. | "Remain Silent" | 4:20 |

== Personnel ==
Metal Church

- Ronny Munroe – lead vocals
- Rick Van Zandt – lead guitar
- Kurdt Vanderhoof – rhythm guitar, producer, engineer, mixing, cover design
- Steve Unger – bass, backing vocals
- Jeff Plate – drums

Additional personnel

- Tim Harding – engineer
- Joao Duarte – art
- Kathy Moats – layout
