= Double Live Assassins =

Live album by W.A.S.P.
- Released: February 24, 1998
- Recorded: 1997
- Genre: Heavy metal
- Length: 101:30
- Label: CMC International
- Producer: Blackie Lawless

W.A.S.P. chronology
Kill Fuck Die (1997)	Double Live Assassins (1998)	Helldorado (1999)

Professional ratings
Review scores
Source	Rating
AllMusic	2.5/5 stars
Chronicles of Chaos	8/10
Collector's Guide to Heavy Metal	7/10

Double Live Assassins is a live album by American heavy metal group W.A.S.P. It was recorded live during their K.F.D. World Tour in 1997. It was released in February 1998 in the United Kingdom and in the United States in June of that same year.

== Track listing ==
All songs written by Blackie Lawless, except where noted.

Disc one
No.	Title	Length
1.	"The Medley": "On Your Knees"; "I Don't Need No Doctor" (Jo Armstead, Nick Ashford, Valerie Simpson); "Hellion"; "Chainsaw Charlie (Murders in the New Morgue)"	11:32
2.	"Wild Child" (Chris Holmes, Lawless)	6:03
3.	"Animal (Fuck Like a Beast)"	4:13
4.	"L.O.V.E. Machine"	4:16
5.	"Killahead" (Holmes, Lawless)	3:51
6.	"I Wanna Be Somebody"	6:27
7.	"U" (Holmes, Lawless)	5:34
8.	"The Real Me" (Pete Townshend) (The Who cover)	3:37
9.	"Kill Your Pretty Face" (Holmes, Lawless)	6:34
10.	"The Horror" (Holmes, Lawless)	9:10

Disc two
No.	Title	Length
1.	"Blind in Texas"	5:34
2.	"The Headless Children"	5:46
3.	"The Idol"	6:14
4.	"The Crimson Idol Medley: "The Titanic Overture"; "The Invisible Boy"; "I Am One"; "The Gypsy Meets the Boy"; "The Great Misconceptions of Me"	10:37
5.	"Little Death" (Holmes, Lawless)	4:17
6.	"Mean Man"	3:51
7.	"Rock and Roll to Death"	3:52

== Personnel ==
W.A.S.P.

- Blackie Lawless – lead vocals, guitars, producer
- Chris Holmes – guitars
- Stet Howland – drums, backing vocals
- Mike Duda – bass, backing vocals

Production

- Stan Katayama – mixing
- Eddy Schreyer – mastering

== Charts ==
Chart (1998)	Peak position
UK Independent Albums (OCC)	20
