= A Light in the Dark =

Studio album by Metal Church
- Released: June 16, 2006
- Studio: The English Channel Studio (Olympia, Washington)
- Genres: Heavy metal; thrash metal
- Length: 61:56
- Label: SPV/Steamhammer
- Producer: Kurdt Vanderhoof

Metal Church chronology
The Weight of the World (2004)	A Light in the Dark (2006)	This Present Wasteland (2008)

A Light in the Dark is the eighth studio album by American heavy metal band Metal Church, released on June 16, 2006 in Germany, June 19 in the rest of Europe, and June 27 in the US. This was the third Metal Church album to feature the cruciform Gibson Explorer on a cover, as well as the last to feature Jay Reynolds on guitar. It was also the first to feature Jeff Plate on drums.

"Watch the Children Pray 2006" is a tribute to original Metal Church vocalist David Wayne, who died on May 9, 2005, from gangrene in his legs following a car crash.

== Reception ==
Professional ratings
Review scores
Source	Rating
AllMusic	3.5/5 stars
Blabbermouth.net	8.5/10
Rock Hard	8/10

AllMusic Greg Prato reviewed the album positively and commented that it is "unmistakably" Metal Church, in spite of the fact that only Kurdt Vanderhoof is the only remaining founding member of the band who performs on the record. Prato stated that A Light in the Dark "could easily be mistaken for a thrash metal release of the '80s" because of songs like "A Light in the Dark" and "Beyond All Reason". Keith Bergman of Blabbermouth.net had the same feeling, as the production "seems designed to recall past glories", but praised A Light in the Dark for being "more cohesive, more like a band effort, and not coincidentally, the most consistent album since the band's heyday with late frontman David Wayne." Rock Hard reviewer called it a "good, in the most positive sense, old-fashioned metal album with a balanced mix of proven power riffs, beautiful melodies and some sing-along choruses", though it did not approach qualitatively the band's early classics. Greg Pratt of Exclaim! wrote that "Metal Church are proving themselves to be a dependable metal institution", but criticized the album for being too long, for having "too many mid-tempo blah rockers" and for the "sense of melodrama that dogs down" many songs.

== Track listing ==
All tracks are written by Ronny Munroe, Kurdt Vanderhoof, except where indicated.

No.	Title	Writer(s)	Length
1.	"A Light in the Dark"		5:27
2.	"Beyond All Reason"		5:40
3.	"Mirror of Lies"		4:19
4.	"Disappear"		6:02
5.	"The Believer"		5:29
6.	"Temples of the Sea"	Vanderhoof	9:27
7.	"Pill for the Kill"		4:28
8.	"Son of the Son"		4:45
9.	"More Than Your Master"		4:47
10.	"Blinded by Life"		3:31
11.	"Watch the Children Pray 2006" (bonus track)	David Wayne, Vanderhoof, Craig Wells	5:45

== Personnel ==
Metal Church

- Ronny Munroe – lead vocals
- Jay Reynolds – lead guitar
- Kurdt Vanderhoof – rhythm guitar, keyboards, producer, engineer, mixing
- Steve Unger – bass, backing vocals
- Jeff Plate – drums

Production

- Mark Greer – mixing
- Kai Swillus – artwork
