= Stet Howland =

American drummer (born 1960)

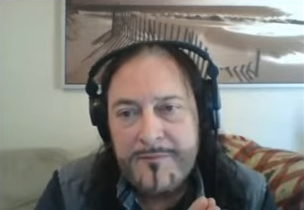
- Howland in 2020

Background information
- Born: August 14, 1960 (age 65); Duxbury, Massachusetts, U.S.
- Genres: Heavy metal
- Occupation: Drummer
- Years active: 1978–present
- Website: stethowland.com

Stet Howland (born August 14, 1960) is an American heavy metal drummer who is a former member of Metal Church and a former longtime member of W.A.S.P.

== Early life ==
Howland graduated in 1978 from Duxbury High School. He started playing drums at age seven and has been teaching and playing for a living since age 13. His influences are Buddy Rich, Gene Krupa, Animal from The Muppets, Sam Kinison, and Hulk Hogan.

== Career ==
Howland played for Temple of Brutality (2004–2006), RUN21 (1987–1988), Killing Machine (2003–2005), JOETOWN (2000-2002) Belladonna (1997–1999), The Howlin' Dogs, Impellitteri (1988–1990), WASP (1991–2005), and Carnival of Souls (2003–2005). In February 2006, he announced his departure from W.A.S.P. to concentrate on his own projects. Howland also was a drummer in Blackfoot. He was the drummer for Lita Ford and performed with her at Rocklahoma 2008, and can be found on Lita Ford's album Wicked Wonderland. Drums for the album were recorded at Howland's personal studio in southwest Florida. In 2010 Howland recorded drum tracks at his studio for a cover of "Thunder Thighs" on Whole Lotta Love: An All-Star Salute to Fat Chicks.

In 2010, Howland founded the reality-based rock 'n' roll television series Stet TV.

Howland is currently playing with a band titled Where Angels Suffer, with Chris Holmes (guitar; ex-W.A.S.P.), Ira Black (guitar; ex-Lizzy Borden), Steve Unger (bass; Metal Church), and Rich Lewis (vocals; Randy Piper's Animal). On July 2, 2011, Howland joined 10,000 Views, a Fort Myers, Florida based powerhouse rock band. Other current members of 10,000 Views are Timmy Johnson (lead vocals/rhythm guitar) and John Hyatt (lead guitar/vocals).

In April 2017, it was announced that Howland had joined heavy metal band Metal Church after the departure of previous drummer Jeff Plate.

== Discography ==
W.A.S.P.

- The Crimson Idol (1992)
- Still Not Black Enough (1995)
- Kill.Fuck.Die (1997)
- Double Live Assassins (1998)
- Helldorado (1999)
- The Sting (2000)
- Unholy Terror (2001)
- The Neon God: Part 1 - The Rise (2004)
- The Neon God: Part 2 - The Demise (2004)

Run 21

- Flat Blank Parts (1987)

Stream

- Take It or Leave It (1995)
- Chasing the Dragon (2002)

Belladonna

- Spells of Fear (1996)

Mike Vescera Project

- Altar (2000–2004)

Joetown

- Feelin' Rock'n'Roll (2000)

Carnival of Souls

- Ashes to Ashes (2004)

Superseed

- Superseed (2004)

Killing Machine

- Killing Machine (2004)

Temple of Brutality

- Lethal Agenda (2005)

Lita Ford

- Wicked Wonderland (2009)

Metal Church

- Damned If You Do (2018)
- Congregation of Annihilation (2023)

Last Temptation

- Last Temptation (2019)

== Projects ==
Howland has toured with and or recorded with:

- Vengeance
- Snapdragon
- Rockestra
- Run21
- Impellitteri
- Kuni
- Big Richard
- Belladonna
- Uriah Heep
- MVP (Michael Vescera Project)
- 3HB
- Joetown (Joe Delaney)
- WASP
- Stream
- Superseed
- Blackfoot
- Lynyrd Skynyrd
- Killing Machine
- The Howlin Dogs
- The Lucky Dogs
- The Biscuit Band
- Temple of Brutality
- The New Kings
- Lita Ford
- Stet TV Band
- W.A.S.
- 10,000 Views
- Four by Fate
