= Damned If You Do (album) =

Studio album by Metal Church
- Released: December 7, 2018
- Genres: Heavy metal; thrash metal
- Length: 45:13
- Label: Rat Pak
- Producer: Kurdt Vanderhoof

Metal Church chronology
XI (2016)	Damned If You Do (2018)	Congregation of Annihilation (2023)

Damned If You Do is the twelfth studio album by American heavy metal band Metal Church, released on December 7, 2018, through Rat Pak Records. It is their first release with former W.A.S.P. drummer Stet Howland, who replaced longtime member Jeff Plate in 2017, and their final album to feature vocalist Mike Howe before his suicide in 2021. Music videos were made for the songs "Damned If You Do" and "By the Numbers".

== Background ==
About seven months after the release of XI, frontman Mike Howe was asked if he intended to write another album with Metal Church; his response was, "We have every intention of doing that and that's what it's all about. If you're not putting on new music, then it's time to go away for me. In Metal Church... it's always been like a two-year cycle band, but we put our album out this year in March. So our album is actually only being out for six months. But we have plans on this fall getting back to writing and try to put something out next year. We're also looking at some dates for the spring possibly back in the States and maybe back over here. But our drummer Jeff, he's also on the TSO. He leaves from the end of October through December. So we might take that time to start writing new record."

On March 21, 2017, Plate announced that he had left Metal Church, and was later replaced by Howland. In a May 2017 interview, Vanderhoof stated that Metal Church had begun writing and demoing their next album, which was tentatively due in early 2018.

On October 1, 2018, the band teased an audio sample of a brand-new song from the album.

== Composition ==
Kurdt Vanderhoof explained the theme behind the album: "The cover actually has to do with the era that we are living in currently with all the deception that's going on politically and socially that you have to be extremely careful about who and what you listen to and believe. So the cover is an aspect of it, it's not a bash on the Catholic Church or anything like that. It basically says that you have to be careful of who you listen to, and just because you're sitting in a church it doesn't mean that you necessarily are hearing the truth. The devil is at work in the church as well and his biggest lie is that he doesn't exist. So that's one aspect of it and then the title also reflects kind of some of the lyrical contents of the record that is somewhat, you know, current event oriented. The same thing replays to not necessarily with the church or spirituality or your faith but it has to do with in an era of fake news and all the deception that's going on. You have to be extremely careful about who and what you believe. Just because it's on the news doesn't mean that it's true. You really have to spend a lot of time searching out the truth and if you don't [you're] damned if you do, if you believe the lies. That's what the cover is about and some of the lyrical contents of the album."

== Track listing ==
No.	Title	Length
1.	"Damned If You Do"	4:35
2.	"The Black Things"	5:16
3.	"By the Numbers"	4:35
4.	"Revolution Underway"	5:25
5.	"Guillotine"	4:47
6.	"Rot Away"	3:26
7.	"Into the Fold"	4:20
8.	"Monkey Finger"	4:15
9.	"Out of Balance"	4:25
10.	"The War Electric"	4:09
Total length:		45:13

== Notes ==
The Japanese release by Nexus Records contains a second disc of the 2017 live album Classic Live.

== Personnel ==
- Mike Howe – lead vocals
- Rick Van Zandt – lead guitar
- Kurdt Vanderhoof – rhythm guitar, Mellotron
- Steve Unger – bass, backing vocals
- Stet Howland – drums

Production

- Produced by Kurdt Vanderhoof
- Engineered by Kurdt Vanderhoof and Johnny Hyatt
- Album artwork by Jean Michel

== Charts ==
Chart (2018)	Peak position
German Albums (Offizielle Top 100)	68
Swiss Albums (Schweizer Hitparade)	83
