= Hanging in the Balance =

Studio album by Metal Church
- Released: October 7, 1993
- Recorded: 1992–1993
- Studios: Music Storage Studios (Aberdeen, Washington); Studio 900 (New York City); Studio Works II (Island Park, New York)
- Genres: Heavy metal; thrash metal
- Length: 56:45
- Labels: Blackheart (US and Japan); SPV/Steamhammer (Europe)
- Producers: Thom Panunzio, Kenny Laguna, Paul O'Neill

Metal Church chronology
The Human Factor (1991)	Hanging in the Balance (1993)	Live (1998)

Professional ratings
Review scores
Source	Rating
AllMusic	3/5 stars
Collector's Guide to Heavy Metal	9/10
Rock Hard	9.5/10

Hanging in the Balance is the fifth album by American heavy metal band Metal Church, released in 1993. It was Metal Church's last album before their two-year break up from 1996 to 1998, and the last to feature vocalist Mike Howe for more than two decades until his return to the band in 2015. Reportedly Howe disliked the album cover so much that it contributed to his decision to leave the band. It is also their last studio album with longtime guitarist Craig Wells and drummer Kirk Arrington (until his return on 2004's The Weight of the World).

In 2021, Simon Young of Kerrang! included the album in his list of "50 of the worst album covers ever". He wrote: "If there was a brief for this staggering illustration, it was clearly misinterpreted."

== Background ==
On why he left Metal Church in 1995, Mike Howe stated in an interview in 2017: "I left Metal Church because of managerial and record company and outside pressures that were putting Metal Church in a position that was not to my liking. They were ruining the band for me business-wise. Small examples like the record cover of 'Hanging In The Balance', which was something that I did not approve of and something I did not like at all. And so… [Laughs] It's okay if you like it, but for me, it was not something that I liked. Things like that, the way it was recorded and mixed and the pressures put on me and to push me in ways that I didn't want to be pushed, so things like that. It came to a head to where this is not the band I envisioned and Kurdt envisions and we're basically being bullied around by a management company that doesn't understand us. They think they know better than us. I was like, 'This is it. I'm getting off the ship before it goes down.'

== Track listing ==
No.	Title	Writer(s)	Length
1.	"Gods of Second Chance"	Mike Howe, Kurdt Vanderhoof, Paul O'Neill	5:23
2.	"Losers in the Game"	Howe, Vanderhoof	5:08
3.	"Hypnotized"	Howe, John Marshall, Vanderhoof	4:43
4.	"No Friend of Mine"	Howe, Vanderhoof	3:58
5.	"Waiting for a Savior"	Howe, Vanderhoof, O'Neill	5:48
6.	"Conductor"	Craig Wells, Vanderhoof	4:10
7.	"Little Boy"	Marshall, Vanderhoof	8:14
8.	"Down to the River"	Howe, Vanderhoof	5:01
9.	"End of the Age"	Howe, Vanderhoof	7:17
10.	"Lovers and Madmen"	Marshall	2:51
11.	"A Subtle War"	Marshall, Vanderhoof	4:12

European edition bonus track
No.	Title	Writer(s)	Length
12.	"Low to Overdrive"	Vanderhoof	4:27

Digipak release bonus tracks
No.	Title	Writer(s)	Length
12.	"Start the Fire" (live)	David Wayne, Wells, Vanderhoof
13.	"Fake Healer" (live)	Marshall, Vanderhoof
14.	"Losers in the Game" (live)	Howe, Vanderhoof

== Personnel ==
Metal Church

David Wayne- Vocals

- Mike Howe – vocals
- Craig Wells – lead guitar
- John Marshall – rhythm guitar
- Duke Erickson – bass
- Kirk Arrington – drums

Additional musicians

- Kurdt Vanderhoof – additional guitars
- Jerry Cantrell – lead guitar on "Gods of Second Chance"
- Randy Hansen – lead guitar on "Conductor"
- Joan Jett, Allison Wolfe, Kathleen Hanna – backing vocals on "Little Boy"

Production

- Thom Panunzio – producer, engineer, mixing at The Hit Factory, New York
- Kenny Laguna – producer
- Paul O'Neill – producer on tracks 1, 5, 6, 10, musical director, arrangements with Kurdt Vanderhoof and Metal Church
- Adam Kasper, Chuck Johnson, Glen Robinson, John Aiosa, Lee Anthony, Thom Cadley – assistant engineers
- Greg Calbi – mastering at Sterling Sound, New York

== Charts ==
Chart (1993)	Peak position
German Albums (Offizielle Top 100)	79
