= The Weight of the World (Metal Church album) =

Studio album by Metal Church
- Released: September 28, 2004
- Studio: The English Channel Studio (Olympia, Washington)
- Genre: Heavy metal; thrash metal
- Length: 56:34
- Label: SPV/Steamhammer
- Producer: Kurdt Vanderhoof, Chris Jacobson

Metal Church chronology
Masterpeace (1999)	The Weight of the World (2004)	A Light in the Dark (2006)

The Weight of the World is the seventh studio album by American heavy metal band Metal Church. It was released in 2004 through the Steamhammer/SPV label.

This album marks the beginning of Metal Church's third major line-up, with the addition of Ronny Munroe (vocals), Jay Reynolds (guitar), and Steve Unger (bass). This album is also the last to feature Kirk Arrington on drums. It is hailed by critics and fans alike as Metal Church's comeback album.

The prevalent themes of this album include crime, war, rejection, and madness.

== Reception ==
Professional ratings
Review scores
Source	Rating
AllMusic	3.5/5 stars
Blabbermouth.net	6.5/10
Rock Hard	9/10

Reviews for The Weight of the World were mixed. Reviewer Eduardo Rivadavia of AllMusic lamented "the band's maddening tendencies for songwriting inconsistency, matching every memorable turn like 'Hero's Soul' or 'Sunless Sky' with an equally forgettable outing like 'Wings of Tomorrow' or 'Bomb to Drop.'" He criticized new singer Ronny Munroe, who "doesn't always have the power or presence to match the surrounding onslaught", but stated his belief that longtime fans of the band would like most of the album's songs. Tony Daley of Blabbermouth.net was also critical of Munroe's performance and was not convinced by "the sound of the pre-thrash New Wave Of British Heavy Metal" the album offers and by "the pool of average ideas" that makes up the eight minute pièce de résistance "Madman's Soul". However he conceded that if "you don't mind the odd dip in quality, then Weight of the World is a likable, if flawed, piece of work."

Exclaim! review by Greg Pratt was more positive, stating that The Weight of the World "gives that metal punch we all knew the band was capable of delivering", because "the ten tunes are jam-packed with classic '80s heavy metal riffs, from glorious thrash to some NWOBHM melodic near-punksters". Rock Hard reviewer remarked the 1980s feel of the music and praised the "smoky-aggressive voice" of Munroe and Metal Church for providing "grand songwriting, horny hooks and a feeling for the synthesis of hammer-hard rhythms and memorable melodies." Despite "the somewhat muddy production and one or two average songs" he elected Weight of the World the comeback album of the year.

== Track listing ==
All tracks are written by Ronny Munroe and Kurdt Vanderhoof, except where indicated

No.	Title	Writer(s)	Length
1.	"Leave Them Behind"		5:47
2.	"Weight of the World"	Munroe, Vanderhoof, Kirk Arrington	5:24
3.	"Hero's Soul"		4:45
4.	"Madman's Overture"	Vanderhoof	8:35
5.	"Sunless Sky"		5:28
6.	"Cradle to Grave"		5:54
7.	"Wings of Tomorrow"		6:16
8.	"Time Will Tell"	Munroe, Vanderhoof, Jay Reynolds, Arrington	5:11
9.	"Bomb to Drop"		4:07
10.	"Blood Money"		5:07

== Personnel ==
Metal Church

- Ronny Munroe – vocals
- Kurdt Vanderhoof – guitar, producer, engineer, mixing
- Jay Reynolds – guitar
- Steve Unger – bass
- Kirk Arrington – drums

Production

- Mark Greer – mixing, mastering at Bandit Audio in Olympia, Washington
- Kurdt Vanderhoof, Kathy Moats – artwork
- Dick Moats – photography
- Chris Jacobson – executive producer
