= Meliah Rage =

American heavy metal band

- Origin: Boston, Massachusetts, U.S.
- Genres: Thrash metal; power metal
- Years active: 1986–2021; 2025–present
- Labels: Sony; Metal on Metal
- Members: Anthony Nichols; Jim Koury; Stu Dowie; Paul Souza; Darren Lourie
- Past members: Jesse Johnson; Mike Munro; Sully Erna; Bruce Black

Meliah Rage is an American heavy metal band formed in Boston, Massachusetts, in 1986 by guitarist/songwriter Anthony Nichols. They play thrash metal with classical metal melodies. The band has released 12 albums. Its current members include Anthony Nichols, Jim Koury, Darren Lourie, Paul Souza, and Stu Dowie. They once featured Godsmack frontman Sully Erna on drums, who appeared on the Unfinished Business album.

The band went on hiatus in January 2021 and reunited in 2025.

== Musical style ==
Melia Rage plays a style of speed metal and thrash metal in a vein similar to Metallica, Anthrax, Megadeth, Exodus and the early works of Testament.

== Discography ==
- Kill to Survive (1988, CBS/Epic Records)
- Live Kill (1989, CBS/Epic Records)
- Solitary Solitude (1990, CBS/Epic Records)
- Death Valley Dream (1996, BSR/Locomotive Records)
- Unfinished Business (2002, Screaming Ferret Wreckords; recorded 1992)
- Barely Human (2004, Screaming Ferret Wreckords)
- The Deep and Dreamless Sleep (2006, SFW/Universal Fontana)
- Masquerade (2009, Metro City Records/SFW)
- Dead to the World (2011, Metal on Metal Records)
- Warrior (2014, Metal on Metal Records)
- Before the Kill (compilation 2015, Metal on Metal Records)
- Idol Hands (2018, Metal on Metal Records)
- Slaves in the Afterlife (2026, Metal on Metal Records)
