= Heretic (band) =

American metal band

- Origin: Los Angeles, California, U.S.
- Genres: Speed metal; thrash metal; power metal
- Years active: 1984–1988; 2011–present
- Labels: Metal on Metal; Metal Blade
- Spinoffs: Reverend
- Members: Brian Korban; Julian Mendez; Angelo Espino; Stuart Fuji; Sean McCormick
- Past members: Rick Merrick; Mike Torres; Rick Halpin; Scott Patton; Dennis O'Hara; Bobby Marquez; Mike Howe; Glenn Rogers; Federico Dupay; Jason Rosenfeld; Ignazio Coppola; Dave Chedrick
- Website: hereticusa.com

Heretic is an American heavy metal band from Los Angeles. Beginning in 1984, the group's initial career saw two releases on Metal Blade Records and touring alongside noted heavy metal groups. After their 1988 breakup, singer Mike Howe joined Metal Church while other members founded Reverend.

Guitarist Brian Korban and earlier vocalist Julian Mendez reformed Heretic in 2011. The band released their second full-length album the following year.

== History ==
=== Initial career (1984–1988) ===
The group was founded in Los Angeles in late 1984 by guitarists Brian Korban and Rick Halpin, bassist Scott Patton, drummer Merick Abrajano, and vocalist Mike "Towers" Torres; Halpin and Patton were soon replaced by Bobby Marquez and Dennis O'Hara respectively. After their debut track on the Metal Massacre Vol. 7 compilation on Metal Blade Records, Torres was replaced by Julian Mendez. This lineup released the Torture Knows No Boundary EP on Metal Blade in 1986, and began performing alongside of numerous noted heavy metal bands in Los Angeles.

Mike Howe replaced Mendez later that year. The Breaking Point album was issued on Metal Blade in 1988, shortly before Howe left the band to join Metal Church and Heretic disbanded. O'Hara and Korban formed Reverend in 1989 with former Metal Church vocalist David Wayne. The Don't Turn Your Back!! & Breaking Point compilation album of Heretic material followed on Metal Blade in 1991.

=== Reformation (2011–present) ===
In 2011, Korban, O'Hara and Mendez reformed Heretic with guitarist Glenn Rogers of Hirax, employing a string of drummers that included Federico Dupay, Jason Rosenfeld (an early member of Anthrax), and ultimately Ignazio Coppola. Daniel Cordova (ex-Vengeance Rising) filled in for O'Hara on the "2011 Metal Massacre" mini tour but was later replaced by Angelo Espino, also formerly of Reverend and Hirax. The band released their second album, A Time of Crisis, the following year.

In 2013, Metal Blade released a 3-CD box set containing the Breaking Point album, the Torture Knows No Boundary EP, bonus tracks, and a live DVD featuring shows from 1985 and 1986.

In 2017, the band released their third studio album, A Game You Cannot Win.

In 2024, the band was the subject of the documentary film, Don't Turn Your Back: The Story of Heretic.

== Members ==
Current members

- Brian Korban – guitar (1984–1988, 2011–present)
- Julian Mendez – vocals (1986, 2011–present)
- Stuart Fuji – guitar (2014–present), keyboards (session only 1988)
- Angelo Espino – bass (2012–present)
- Sean McCormick – drums (2018–present)

Former members

- Merick Abrajano– drums (1984–1988)
- Mike Torres – vocals (1984–1986)
- Rick Halpin – guitar (1984–1986)
- Scott Patton – bass (1984–1986)
- Dennis O'Hara – bass (1986–1988, 2011)
- Bobby Marquez – guitar (1986–1988)
- Mike Howe – vocals (1986–1988)
- Glenn Rogers – guitar (2011–2016)
- Federico Dupay – drums (2011)
- Jason Rosenfeld – drums (2011)
- Ignazio Coppola – drums (2012–2013)
- Dave Chedrick – drums (2014–2015)
- Daniel Cordova – bass (2011)

== Discography ==
Albums

- Breaking Point (1988), Metal Blade/Roadrunner
- A Time of Crisis (2012), Metal on Metal
- A Game You Cannot Win (2017)
- Shape of Things to Come (2026)

Boxset

- From the Vault...Broken and Tortured (2013), Metal Blade - 3CD box set

EP

- Torture Knows No Boundary (1986), Metal Blade/Roadrunner

Compilation

- Don't Turn Your Back!! & Breaking Point (1991), Metal Blade

Compilation appearances

- Metal Massacre Vol. 7 (1986)
- Compendium of Metal vol 5. (2012)
