= Metal Church (album) =

Studio album by Metal Church
- Released: July 1984
- Recorded: 1984
- Studio: Steve Lawson Productions, Seattle, Washington
- Genre: Thrash metal; heavy metal; speed metal; power metal
- Length: 41:51
- Label: Ground Zero
- Producer: Metal Church; Terry Date

Metal Church chronology
| Four Hymns (Demo) (1983) | Metal Church (1984) | The Dark (1986) |

Professional ratings
Review scores
| Source | Rating |
|---|---|
| AllMusic | 4/5 stars |
| Collector's Guide to Heavy Metal | 7/10 |
| Rock Hard | 10/10 |

Metal Church is the debut studio album by American heavy metal band Metal Church. The album was originally released by the independent record label Ground Zero in 1984. Based on the success of the album, the band was signed to a recording contract by Elektra Records, who reissued it in 1985. The cover art depicts a cruciform Gibson Explorer hidden in shadows and smoke.

== Reception ==
Metal Church has been received positively. In a retrospective review, Eduardo Rivadavia of Allmusic praised the band's "complex songwriting and aggressive riffing," and called the album "an overlooked classic."

== Track listing ==
All tracks are written by Kurdt Vanderhoof, David Wayne and Craig Wells, except where noted.

Side one
| No. | Title | Writer(s) | Length |
|---|---|---|---|
| 1. | "Beyond the Black" | | 6:23 |
| 2. | "Metal Church" | | 5:03 |
| 3. | "Merciless Onslaught" (instrumental) | Vanderhoof | 2:54 |
| 4. | "Gods of Wrath" | | 6:41 |

Side two
| No. | Title | Writer(s) | Length |
|---|---|---|---|
| 5. | "Hitman" | Wayne, Vanderhoof | 4:39 |
| 6. | "In the Blood" | | 3:31 |
| 7. | "(My Favorite) Nightmare" | | 3:12 |
| 8. | "Battalions" | Vanderhoof, Wells | 4:53 |
| 9. | "Highway Star" (Deep Purple cover) | Ritchie Blackmore, Ian Gillan, Roger Glover, Jon Lord, Ian Paice | 4:39 |

European edition bonus track
| No. | Title | Length |
|---|---|---|
| 10. | "Big Guns" (demo) | 3:23 |

== Personnel ==
Credits adapted from the album's liner notes.

Metal Church

- David Wayne – vocals
- Craig Wells – lead guitar
- Kurdt Vanderhoof – rhythm guitar
- Duke Erickson – bass
- Kirk Arrington – drums, percussion

Production

- Terry Date – producer, engineer
- Metal Church – producers
- Jack Skinner – mastering
- Saulius Pempe – photography
- Willie Mackay – executive producer
- Kurdt Vanderhoof – logo design
