= John Marshall (guitarist) =

American guitarist (born 1962)

- Born: January 4, 1962 (age 64)
- Genres: Heavy metal; thrash metal
- Occupations: Musician
- Instruments: Guitar
- Years active: 1986–2001; 2007; 2011; 2017; 2020
- Formerly of: Metal Church; Blind Illusion
- Website: metalchurchmusic.com

John Marshall (born January 4, 1962) is an American musician, best known as a former guitarist for the heavy metal band Metal Church (1986–1996, 1998–2001).

== Career ==
Marshall was the guitar tech for Metallica's lead guitarist Kirk Hammett. He also became the fill-in rhythm guitarist for Metallica's James Hetfield on two occasions when Hetfield was injured; first in 1986 (while still performing his duties as guitar tech) while Hetfield's wrist was broken, and again in 1992 when Hetfield was recovering from burn injuries. Marshall joined the band onstage for a performance of "Sad but True" during Metallica's four-day 30th anniversary concert in December 2011 at the Fillmore in San Francisco.

He also briefly played in progressive thrash metal band Blind Illusion (which also featured Les Claypool and Larry LaLonde of Primus).

== Personal life ==
Marshall stands 6 ft 7 in (201 cm). Marshall also has type 1 diabetes.

As of 2010, Marshall also worked for Mesa/Boogie Amplification, being an employee since 1995. He currently works in the company's R&D department, and was the lead designer for Mesa Rectifier "Reborn" series, which was released in 2010.

== Discography ==
With Metal Church

- Blessing in Disguise (1989)
- The Human Factor (1991)
- Hanging in the Balance (1993)
- Masterpeace (1999)
