= Mike Howe =

American heavy metal singer (1965–2021)

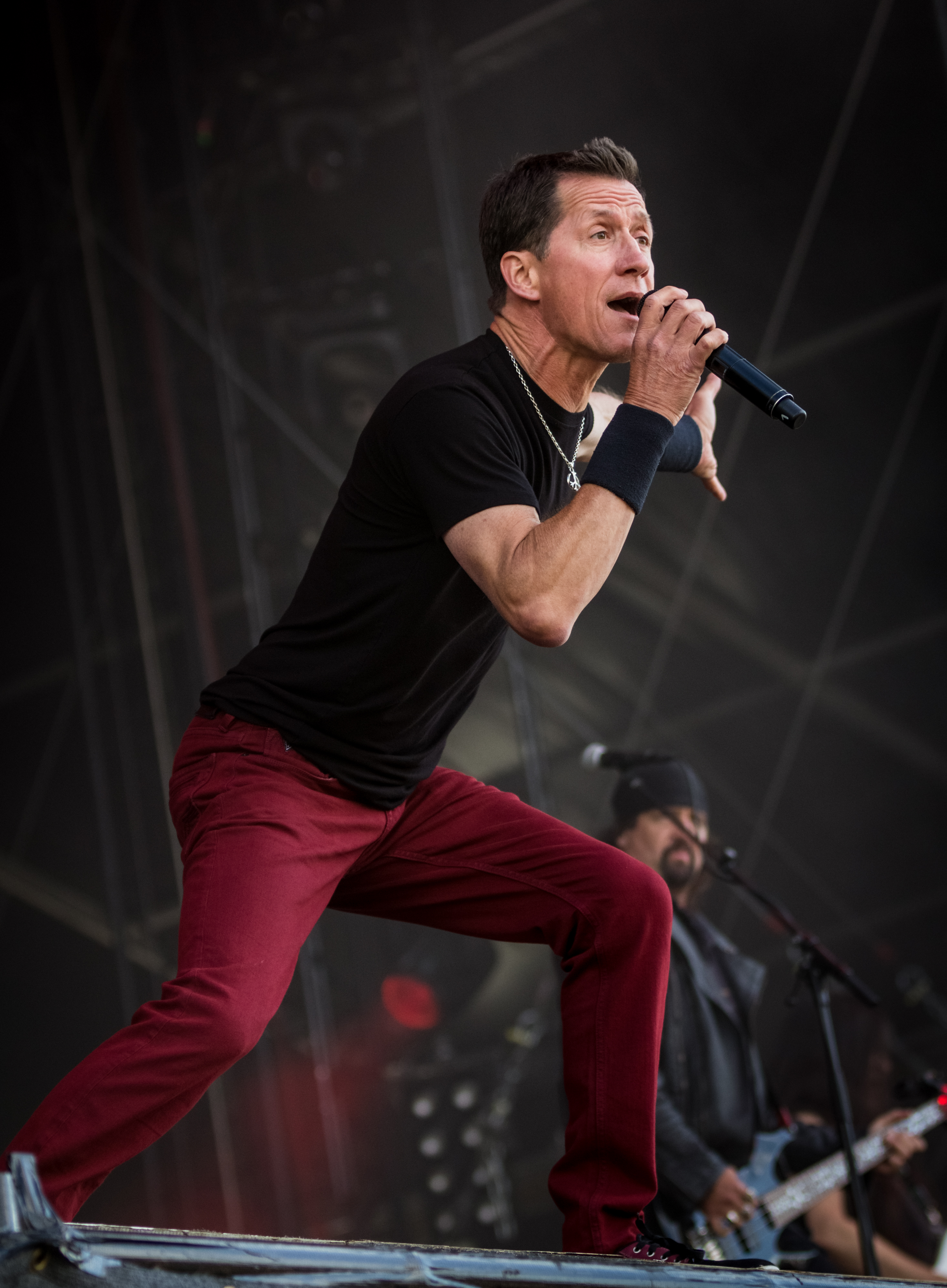
- Howe with Metal Church at Wacken Open Air 2016

Background information
- Born: August 21, 1965; Taylor, Michigan, U.S.
- Died: July 26, 2021 (aged 55) Eureka, California, U.S.
- Genres: Heavy metal; thrash metal; power metal; speed metal
- Occupation: Singer
- Instrument: Vocals
- Years active: 1986–1997; 2015–2021
- Formerly of: Metal Church; Heretic

Mike Howe (August 21, 1965 – July 26, 2021) was an American heavy metal singer who performed with Metal Church, Heretic and briefly with mid 80s Los Angeles metal band Snair.

== Career ==
Howe began his career as the singer for a Detroit band called Hellion (later renamed Snair after moving to Los Angeles) before joining the band Heretic, who were formed in 1986. Heretic released its sole full-length album, Breaking Point in 1988 before Howe departed to join Metal Church and Heretic disbanded.

From 1988 until 1996 Howe sang in Metal Church, replacing David Wayne. After Howe joined Metal Church the subject matter deepened. The band's lyrics tackled political and social issues of the day with the releases of Blessing in Disguise and The Human Factor. Howe recorded three albums with Metal Church before the group split up in 1996.

Although he had rarely recorded or performed outside of Heretic and Metal Church, Howe provided guest vocals on Hall Aflame's 1991 album Guaranteed Forever and Megora's 1997 EP Illusions.

On why he left Metal Church in 1995, Mike Howe stated in an interview in 2017: "I left Metal Church because of managerial and record company and outside pressures that were putting Metal Church in a position that was not to my liking. They were ruining the band for me business-wise. Small examples like the record cover of [1993's] 'Hanging In The Balance', which was something that I did not approve of and something I did not like at all. And so… [Laughs] It's okay if you like it, but for me, it was not something that I liked. Things like that, the way it was recorded and mixed and the pressures put on me and to push me in ways that I didn't want to be pushed, so things like that. It came to a head to where this is not the band I envisioned and Kurdt envisions and we're basically being bullied around by a management company that doesn't understand us. They think they know better than us. I was like, 'This is it. I'm getting off the ship before it goes down.'

Metal Church founder Kurdt Vanderhoof reported in 1998 that Howe had retired and was living in Tennessee with his family. Outside music, he had a full-time job in carpentry and was a father to two sons born in 1997 and 2002, respectively.

On April 30, 2015, Metal Church announced that Howe had rejoined the band, and he appeared on two more albums with them – XI (2016) and Damned If You Do (2018), as well as their 2017 live album Classic Live and the 2020 compilation album From The Vault.

== Death ==
On July 26, 2021, Metal Church announced via the band's Facebook page that Howe had died that morning at his home in Eureka, California, aged 55. The cause of death was ruled suicide. He was the second singer of Metal Church to have died following David Wayne in 2005.

== Discography ==
=== With Heretic ===
- Breaking Point (1988, Metal Blade)

=== With Metal Church ===
- Blessing in Disguise (1989)
- The Human Factor (1991)
- Hanging in the Balance (1993)
- XI (2016)
- Classic Live (2017)
- Damned If You Do (2018)
- From the Vault (2020)
