= Kurdt Vanderhoof =

American guitarist (born 1961)

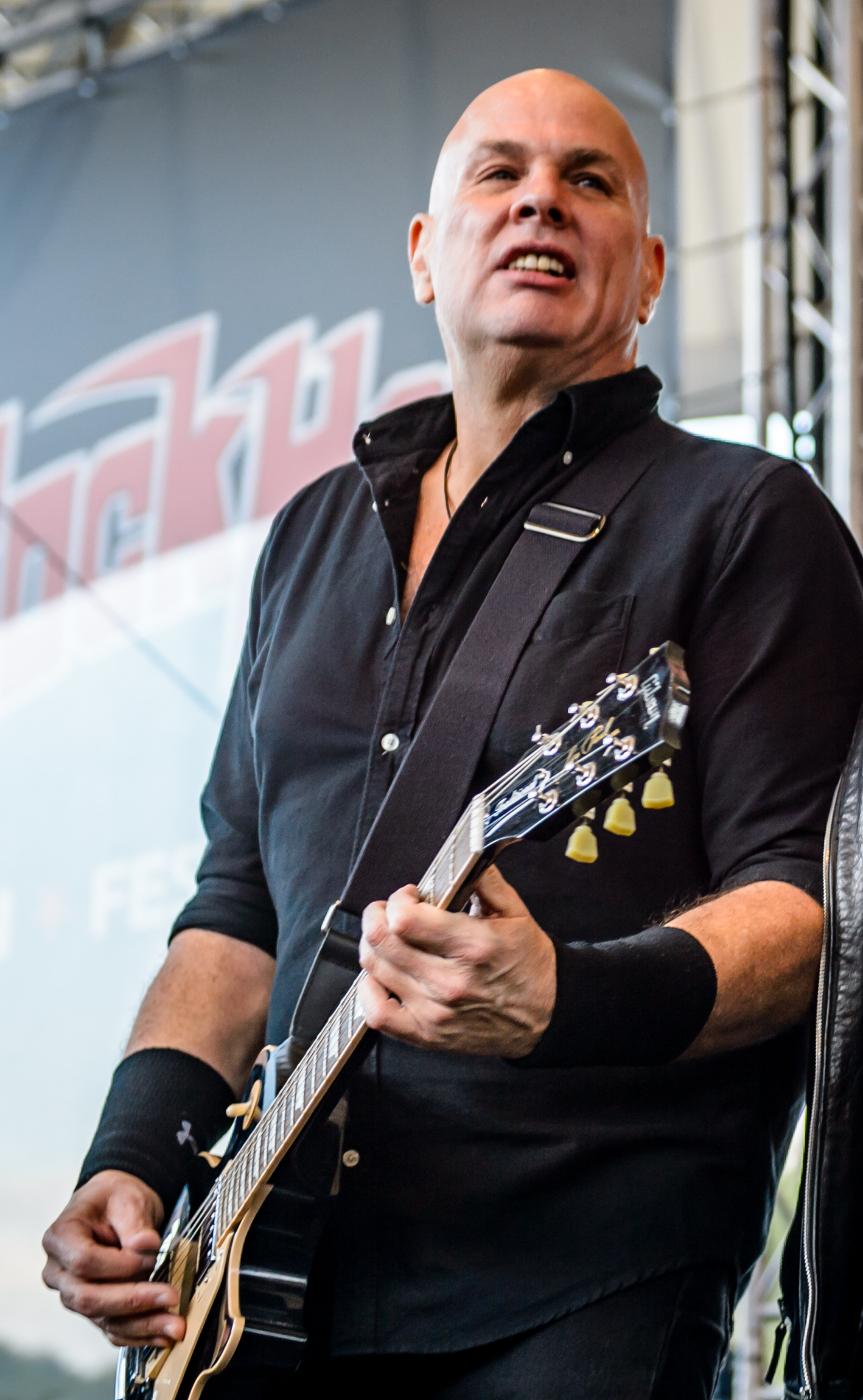
- Vanderhoof with Metal Church in 2016

Background information
- Also known as: Blobbo
- Born: June 28, 1961 (age 64)
- Origin: Aberdeen, Washington, U.S.
- Genres: Heavy metal, thrash metal, power metal, speed metal, progressive rock
- Occupations: Musician, songwriter
- Instruments: Guitar, keyboards, mellotron, synthesizer, bass
- Years active: 1976–present
- Member of: Metal Church, Presto Ballet, Hall AFlame
- Formerly of: The Lewd

Kurdt Vanderhoof (born June 28, 1961) is an American guitarist, best known as the rhythm guitarist and founding member of the heavy metal band Metal Church.

== Biography ==
=== Early bands ===
As early as 1976, Vanderhoof actively networked with local musicians in his hometown of Aberdeen, Washington, and formed a band called Tyr, with Kirk Arrington on drums and Vanderhoof on rhythm guitar. In 1978, he joined Seattle hardcore punk band, The Lewd, adopted the stage name "Blobbo," playing bass guitar, then switching to guitar the following year. The Lewd relocated from Seattle to San Francisco in 1980.

After his departure from The Lewd, Vanderhoof formed Metal Church, whose name was inspired by a nickname given to his San Francisco apartment. He later moved back to Aberdeen, with a vinyl single of "Kill Yourself" as proof of his time with the Lewd.

=== Metal Church ===
In the summer of 1982, Vanderhoof formed Shrapnel, a heavy metal cover band consisting of Tom Weber on drums, Duke Erickson on bass (both from Hoquiam), vocalist Mike Murphey, ("Muff", from Montesano) and a guitar player Vanderhoof knew from Aberdeen High School. Shrapnel played four events to warm up, including a party at Pacific Lutheran University. The other guitar player quit after a religious experience that led to unwillingness to cover "The Number of The Beast" by Iron Maiden. Craig Wells took his place, and Kirk Arrington, Tyr bandmate, eventually replaced Weber on drums. When Murphey left the band, they recruited David Wayne for vocal duties. By 1983, Shrapnel had become Metal Church, using Vanderhoof's original S.F. band name.

After Metal Church's second album, The Dark, in 1986, Vanderhoof left the band but nevertheless remained heavily involved in songwriting. He said he left to focus on learning "how to make records" from a production and engineering standpoint. Metal Church disbanded in 1994. The band has since reformed and disbanded many times, with Vanderhoof (returning as a guitarist) as the only remaining original member.

=== Other projects ===
Vanderhoof's post-Metal Church band, Hall Aflame, released a single album, Guaranteed Forever, before breaking up in 1994.

Vanderhoof later formed the band, Vanderhoof, releasing albums Vanderhoof and A Blur in Time in 1997 and 2002 respectively.

In 2005, Vanderhoof and former bandmates started Presto Ballet, a band dedicated to recreating the progressive rock sounds of the mid-1970s. They released their debut album Peace Among the Ruins that same year, with Vanderhoof commenting: "We recorded the whole album in a somewhat 'old-school' manner, which means, analog synthesizers, real Hammond organ and real mellotron sounds".

Vanderhoof reformed Hall Aflame in 2023 with original bassist, Brian Smith, adding vocalist Scott Nutter and drummer Bill Raymond. Their new album Amplifire was released by RatPak Records on May 3, 2024.

In August 2024, Kurdt signed on to compose his first score for filmmaker Billy Henrickle's feature documentary on the life and career of BMX legend and Hollywood stuntman Eddie Fiola.

== Personal life ==
Vanderhoof currently resides in Southern California.
