= List of Heathen band members =

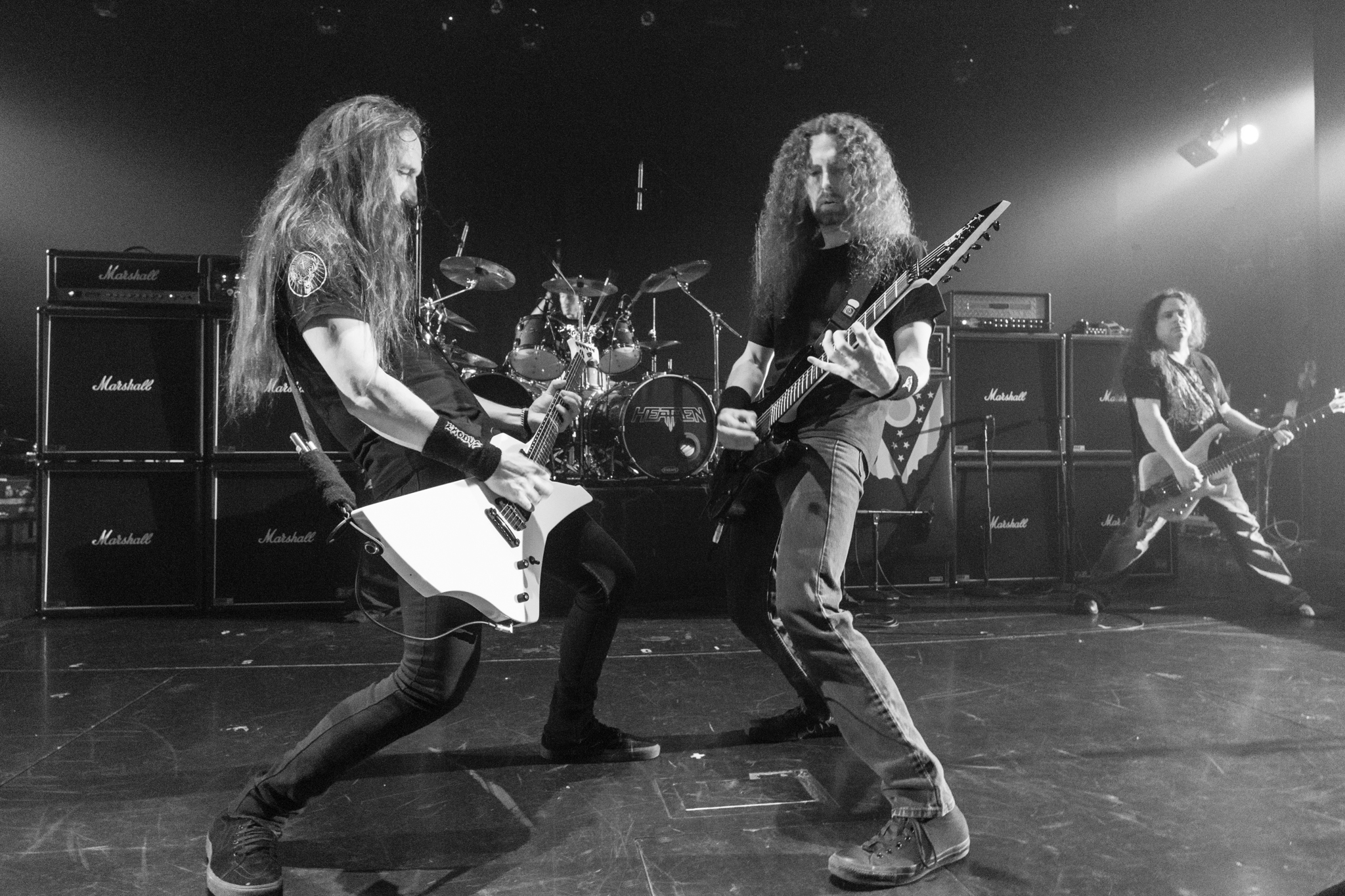
Heathen performing live in 2015

Heathen is an American thrash metal band from San Francisco, California. Formed in 1984, the group originally consisted of vocalist Sam Kress, guitarists Lee Altus and Jim Sanguinetti, and drummer Carl Sacco. After the band's first live performance, Kress and Sanguinetti were replaced by David White (then known as David Godfrey) and Doug Piercy, respectively, while Eric Wong was brought in as their first bassist. The group's current lineup features Altus alongside White (who rejoined in 1989 after leaving in 1988), guitarist Kragen Lum (since 2007) and bassist Jason Mirza (since 2019). On tour, Altus has been replaced by Kyle Edissi since summer 2022, and the band has performed with touring drummer Kyle Idris since early 2023.

== History ==
=== 1984–1993 ===
Heathen was formed in the summer of 1984 by Lee Altus and Carl Sacco, who brought in Sam Kress and Jim Sanguinetti to complete the original lineup. Shortly after performing their first show in April 1985, the band broke up, before Altus and Sacco reformed the band with new second guitarist Doug Piercy in October — bassist Eric Wong joined in November and vocalist David White (then David Godfrey) completed the new lineup in December. After the release of the band's first demo Pray for Death in 1986, Wong left due to "personal reasons", with Mike "Yaz" Jastremski taking over from March 1987. With the new bassist, Heathen released its full-length debut album Breaking the Silence on Combat Records in 1987. Around January 1988, Sacco left Heathen and was replaced by Darren Minter.

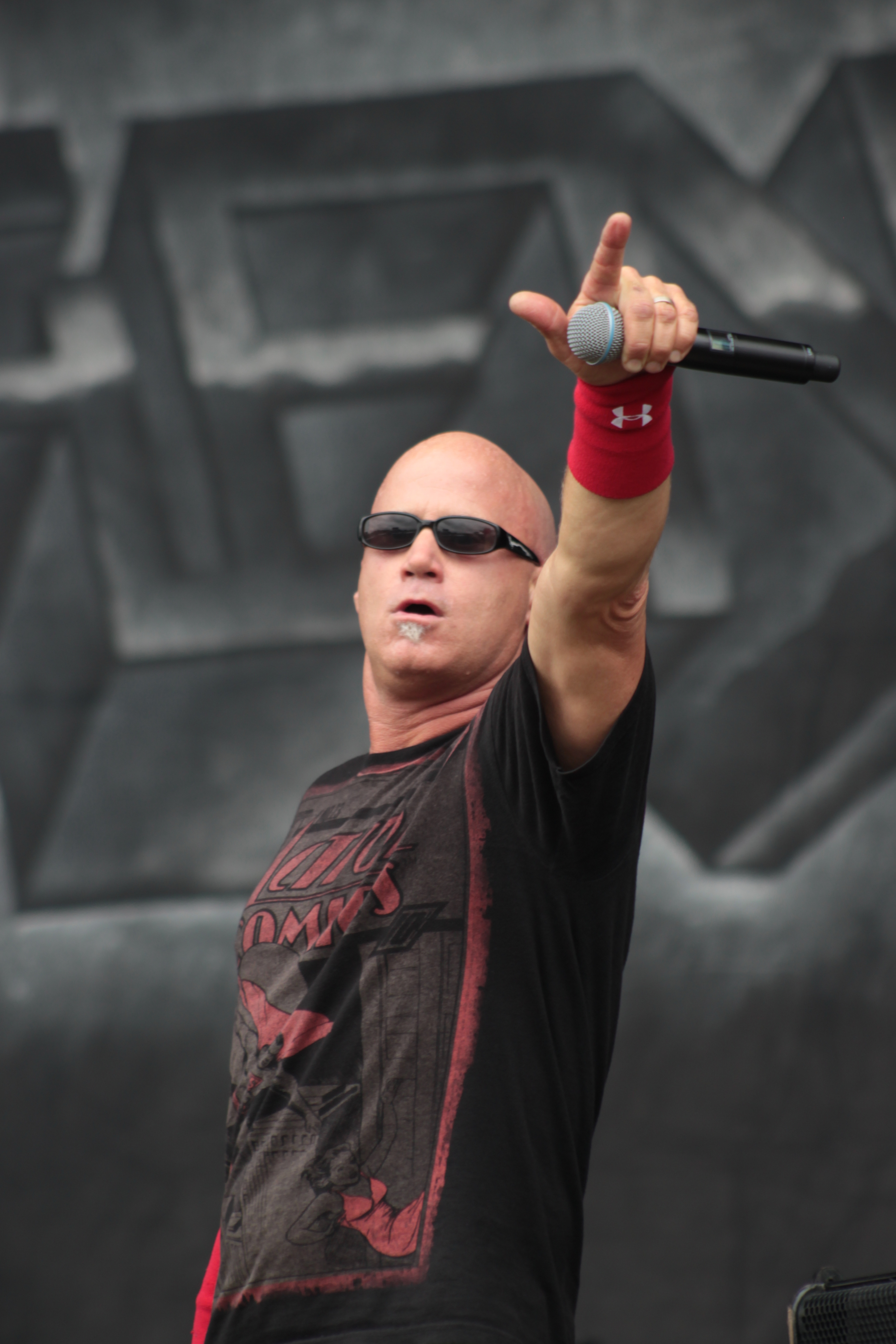
After briefly leaving in 1988, David White rejoined Heathen in early 1989.

After leaving Combat Records and recording a new demo, Heathen dismissed Godfrey in late 1988 and replaced him with former Exodus frontman Paul Baloff. By early 1989, Jastremski had left to form a new band, with Manny Bravo taking his place. Around the same time, Baloff left and was replaced briefly by David Wayne (formerly of Metal Church), followed by Rick Weaver, before Godfrey (now using the name David White) returned in time for the recording of the Opiate of the Masses demo in March. The demo also featured new bassist Vern McElroy, from Blind Illusion. During 1990, the band recorded Victims of Deception with session stand-in Mark Biedermann, before Randy Laird took over in early 1991. During his first tour that summer, Laire died in a car accident; he was later replaced by Jason VieBrooks.

In 1992, Piercy was replaced by Ira Black. The group began work on a planned third album, but broke up the following year. Altus and Minter later joined industrial metal band Die Krupps, White joined Defiance, and VieBrooks co-founded groove metal supergroup Grip Inc.

=== 2001–2019 ===
Heathen reformed in August 2001, with returning members White, Altus, Black and Minter joined by former bassist Mike Jastremski. In June 2004, after the release of Recovered, Jastremski was replaced by Jon Torres. Not long after, Black also left the band, with former Mercenary guitarist Sven Soderlund temporarily taking his place. The remaining four members recorded a demo in early 2005, before announcing the addition of Terry Lauderdale on guitar that June.

Shortly after starting work on a planned third album, Heathen announced in December 2007 that Lauderdale and Minter had left the group, replaced by Prototype guitarist Kragen Lum and former Vio-lence drummer Mark Hernandez, respectively. Less than a year later, Minter had returned to the lineup. The long-awaited third album, The Evolution of Chaos, was recorded with the new lineup and first released in December 2009. During the subsequent touring cycle, Jason VieBrooks returned starting in January 2011 to replace Torres, who temporarily left to "focus on his health". Torres later died on September 2, 2013, and VieBrooks remained a member of the band.

In the spring of 2011, Minter was temporarily replaced by Jon Dette due to "previous work commitments" which prevented him from touring. Two years later, Minter left permanently and Dette stepped in again for tour dates in the summer of 2013. After more than a year of inactivity, in January 2015 the band played with former Forbidden drummer Sasha Horn.

=== Since 2019 ===
After another extended period of inactivity, Heathen announced in June 2019 that it had begun work on a new album. When the result, Empire of the Blind, was announced the following year, it was also revealed that the lineup featured new bassist Jason Mirza and drummer Jim DeMaria. Since the summer of 2022, Altus has been replaced on tour by Kyle Edissi, due to his commitments with Exodus and other issues. DeMaria left after touring until late 2022, with Ryan Idris taking his place from early the next year. During 2025, Jason Bittner contributed drums to recordings for an upcoming album release.

== Members ==
=== Current ===
Image	Name	Years active	Instruments	Release contributions
	Lee Altus	1984–1985; 1985–1993; 2001–present (not touring since 2022)	guitars	all Heathen releases, except Bleed the World Live (2025)
	David White (formerly David Godfrey)	1985–1988; 1989–1993; 2001–present	lead vocals	all Heathen releases
	Kragen Lum	2007–present	guitars; backing vocals	all Heathen releases from The Evolution of Chaos (2009) onwards
	Jason Mirza	2019–present	bass	Empire of the Blind (2020); Bleed the World Live (2025)

=== Former ===
Image	Name	Years active	Instruments	Release contributions
	Carl Sacco	1984–1985; 1985–1988	drums	Pray for Death (1986); Breaking the Silence (1987)
	Sam Kress	1984–1985 (died 2006)	lead vocals	none
	Jim Sanguinetti	1984–1985	guitars	none
	Doug Piercy	1985–1992	guitars	all Heathen releases from Pray for Death (1986) to Victims of Deception (1991); Empire of the Blind (2020) – one track only
	Eric Wong	1985–1986	bass	Pray for Death (1986)
	Mike "Yaz" Jastremski	1986–1988; 2001–2004 (died 2005)	bass	Breaking the Silence (1987); untitled 1988 demo; Recovered (2004)
	Darren Minter	1988–1993; 2001–2007; 2008–2013	drums; backing vocals	all Heathen releases from the untitled 1988 demo to "Goblin's Blade" (live in Aarau 2010) (2018)
	Paul Baloff	1988–1989 (died 2002)	lead vocals	none
	Manny Bravo	1989	bass	none
	David Wayne	1989 (died 2005)	lead vocals	none
	Rick Weaver	1989	lead vocals	none
	Vern McElroy	1989–1990	bass	Opiate of the Masses (1989)
	Randy Laird	1991 (until his death)	bass	none
	Jason VieBrooks	1991–1993; 2011–2019	bass	"Hypnotized" (live in Berlin 2011) (2018); "Control by Chaos" (live at the Dynamo 2013) (2020)
	Ira Black	1992–1993; 2001–2004	guitars	Recovered (2004)
	Jon Torres	2004–2011 (died 2013)	bass; backing vocals	untitled 2005 demo; The Evolution of Chaos (2009); "Goblin's Blade" (live in Aarau 2010) (2018)
	Terry Lauderdale	2005–2007	guitars; backing vocals	The Evolution of Chaos (2009) – two tracks only
	Mark Hernandez	2007–2008	drums	none
	Jim DeMaria	2019–2022	drums	Empire of the Blind (2020)

=== Backup ===
Image	Name	Years active	Instruments	Details
	Mark Biedermann	1990–1991 (session)	bass	Biedermann joined on a session basis to record Heathen's 1991 release Victims of Deception.
	Sven Soderlund	2004 (touring)	guitars	After Ira Black left Heathen, Soderlund temporarily stepped in as the band's touring guitarist.
	Jon Dette	2011; 2013 (both touring)	drums	Dette filled in for Darren Minter in the spring of 2011, and again later when he left in 2013.
	Sasha Horn	2015 (touring)	drums	Horn performed drums with Heathen for the 70,000 Tons of Metal Cruise in January 2015.
	Kyle Edissi	2022–present (touring)	guitars	Edissi has been performing in place of Lee Altus in Heathen's touring lineup since summer 2022.
	Kyle Idris	2023–present (touring)	drums	Idris replaced Jim DeMaria as Heathen's touring drummer starting in early 2023.
	Jason Bittner	2025 (session)	drums	Bittner was brought in to perform drums on Heathen's upcoming fifth studio album during 2025.

== Lineups ==
Bold indicates a new addition to a lineup.

Period	Members	Releases
Summer 1984–spring 1985	Sam Kress — vocals; Lee Altus — guitars; Jim Sanguinetti — guitars; Carl Sacco — drums	none
Band inactive spring–fall 1985
December 1985–March 1987	**David White — vocals**; Lee Altus — guitars; **Doug Piercy — guitars**; **Eric Wong — bass**; Carl Sacco — drums	Pray for Death demo (1986)
March 1987–January 1988	David White — vocals; Lee Altus — guitars; Doug Piercy — guitars; **Mike Jastremski — bass**; Carl Sacco — drums	Breaking the Silence (1987)
January–late 1988	David White — vocals; Lee Altus — guitars; Doug Piercy — guitars; Mike Jastremski — bass; **Darren Minter — drums**	untitled 1988 demo
Late 1988–early 1989	**Paul Baloff — vocals**; Lee Altus — guitars; Doug Piercy — guitars; **Manny Bravo — bass**; Darren Minter — drums	none
Early 1989	**David Wayne — vocals**; Lee Altus — guitars; Doug Piercy — guitars; Manny Bravo — bass; Darren Minter — drums	none
Early 1989	**Rick Weaver — vocals**; Lee Altus — guitars; Doug Piercy — guitars; Manny Bravo — bass; Darren Minter — drums	none
March 1989–1990	**David White — vocals**; Lee Altus — guitars; Doug Piercy — guitars; **Vern McElroy — bass**; Darren Minter — drums	Opiate of the Masses demo (1989)
1990–1991	David White — vocals; Lee Altus — guitars; Doug Piercy — guitars; **Mark Biedermann — bass** (session); Darren Minter — drums	Victims of Deception (1991)
Spring–September 1991	David White — vocals; Lee Altus — guitars; Doug Piercy — guitars; **Randy Laird — bass**; Darren Minter — drums	none
Fall 1991–1992	David White — vocals; Lee Altus — guitars; Doug Piercy — guitars; **Jason VieBrooks — bass**; Darren Minter — drums	none
1992–1993	David White — vocals; Lee Altus — guitars; **Ira Black — guitars**; Jason VieBrooks — bass; Darren Minter — drums	none
Band inactive 1993–2001
August 2001–June 2004	David White — lead vocals; Lee Altus — guitars; Ira Black — guitars; **Mike Jastremski — bass**; Darren Minter — drums, backing vocals	Recovered (2004)
June–July 2004	David White — lead vocals; Lee Altus — guitars; Ira Black — guitars; **Jon Torres — bass, backing vocals**; Darren Minter — drums, backing vocals	none
July–December 2004	David White — lead vocals; Lee Altus — guitars; **Sven Soderlund — guitars** (touring); Jon Torres — bass, backing vocals; Darren Minter — drums, backing vocals	none
December 2004–June 2005	David White — lead vocals; Lee Altus — guitars; Jon Torres — bass, backing vocals; Darren Minter — drums, backing vocals	untitled 2005 demo
June 2005–December 2007	David White — lead vocals; Lee Altus — guitars; **Terry Lauderdale — guitars, backing vocals**; Jon Torres — bass, backing vocals; Darren Minter — drums, backing vocals	none
December 2007–June 2008	David White — lead vocals; Lee Altus — guitars; **Kragen Lum — guitars, backing vocals**; Jon Torres — bass, backing vocals; **Mark Hernandez — drums**	none
June 2008–January 2011	David White — lead vocals; Lee Altus — guitars; **Kragen Lum — guitars, backing vocals**; Jon Torres — bass, backing vocals; **Darren Minter — drums, backing vocals**	The Evolution of Chaos (2009); "Goblin's Blade" (live) (2018)
January 2011– May 2013	David White — lead vocals; Lee Altus — guitars; Kragen Lum — guitars, backing vocals; **Jason VieBrooks — bass** (touring); Darren Minter — drums, backing vocals	"Hypnotized" (live) (2017)
April–May 2011 May–October 2013 (temporary touring lineups)	David White — lead vocals; Lee Altus — guitars; Kragen Lum — guitars, backing vocals; Jason VieBrooks — bass (touring); **Jon Dette — drums** (touring)	"Control by Chaos" (live) (2020)
Band on unofficial hiatus November 2013–December 2014
January 2015 (temporary touring lineup)	David White — lead vocals; Lee Altus — guitars; Kragen Lum — guitars, backing vocals; Jason VieBrooks — bass; **Sasha Horn — drums** (touring)	none
Band on unofficial hiatus February 2015–May 2019
June 2019–summer 2022	David White — lead vocals; Lee Altus — guitars; Kragen Lum — guitars, backing vocals; **Jason Mirza — bass**; **Jim DeMaria — drums**	Empire of the Blind (2020)
Summer–late 2022	David White — lead vocals; Kragen Lum — guitars, backing vocals; **Kyle Edissi — guitars** (touring); Jason Mirza — bass; Jim DeMaria — drums	none
Early 2023–present	David White — lead vocals; Kragen Lum — guitars, backing vocals; Kyle Edissi — guitars (touring); Jason Mirza — bass; **Ryan Idris — drums** (touring)	Bleed the World Live (2025)
