= Victims of Deception =

Studio album by Heathen
- Released: April 12, 1991
- Recorded: 1989–1991
- Studios: Studio D, Sausalito, California; Cloud Nine Studios, Chico, California; Bayview Studios, Richmond, California; Hyde St Studios, San Francisco, California
- Genres: Thrash metal, progressive metal
- Label: Roadrunner
- Producers: Heathen and Rob Beaton

Heathen chronology
Breaking the Silence (1987)	Victims of Deception (1991)	The Evolution of Chaos (2009)

Victims of Deception is the second album by the American thrash metal band Heathen, which was released in 1991 by Roadrunner Records. It was re-issued by Metal Mind Productions in 2006 as a digipak in a limited amount of 2,000 numbered copies.

The bonus track "Hellbound" is a cover of Tygers of Pan Tang. The intro of "Hypnotized" features excerpts from a speech by cult leader Jim Jones. It was the band's last studio album for 18 years until the 2009 release of The Evolution of Chaos.

== History ==
Heathen's lineup changes, tours and financial issues stalled the recording process of this album, which lasted from 1989 to 1991. The band began work on the album in 1988 after David White was replaced by former Exodus singer Paul Baloff.

After recording a demo with Baloff in the fall of 1988, the band broke up after the departure bassist Mike "Yaz" Jastremski, but reunited some time later, with former Metal Church singer David Wayne replacing Baloff and Manny Bravo replacing Yaz. Wayne's tenure with Heathen lasted for only a few days, and White soon returned to the band. Bravo would also leave the band; he was replaced by Blind Illusion bassist Vern McEllroy. The lineup of White, Altus, Piercy, McEllroy and Minter recorded a demo in March 1989, and entered the studio later that year to begin recording their second album under the name Fear of the Unknown, which was intended to be released in 1990. However, due to monetary problems, the album's release was delayed. When the sessions restarted, Heathen did not have an official bass player; the bass tracks were handled by Blind Illusion guitarist/frontman Marc Biedermann. The band had many bassists on this tour and album including Randy Laire, formerly of Sacramento California based band Vision.

Two singles were released: First a cover of Rainbow's "Kill the King", described by Q Magazine as "imbued with ferocious power", and second Heathen's own composition "Prisoners of Fate".

== Musical direction ==
This album is considerably more technical and progressive than its predecessor. It features many tempo changes, complex song structures, odd time signatures, longer song lengths, and more frequent guitar solos. It is considered among the most technical thrash albums ever, and part of the so-called "technical/progressive thrash" movement of the late 1980s, early 1990s (other pivotal albums in this era [chronologically] included Metallica's ...And Justice for All, Deathrow's Deception Ignored, Toxik's Think This, Watchtower's Control and Resistance, Megadeth's Rust in Peace, Dark Angel's Time Does Not Heal and Coroner's Mental Vortex).

== Reception ==
Professional ratings
Review scores
Source	Rating
The Metal Crypt	link
Q Magazine	3/5 stars
Sea of Tranquility	link

Victims of Deception has received a positive response from music critics. Adam McCann of Metal Digest called it "one of the most influential technical thrash metal albums of all time", and wrote, "Taking large amounts of progressive metal, Victims of Deception stepped away from the more pure thrash of Breaking the Silence and came up with a masterpiece. Although the band had many personal issues prior to the making of this album, it didn't stop them from producing beast; longer songs, complex time signatures and fantastic musicianship which saw the band stand alongside the likes of Watchtower, Toxik, Metallica and Megadeth with even a cover of Rainbow's 'Kill the King' not even feeling out of place."

== Track listing ==
All tracks are written by Lee Altus and David White, unless otherwise noted.

Side A
No.	Title	Writer(s)	Length
1.	"Hypnotized"		8:35
2.	"Opiate of the Masses"		7:50
3.	"Heathen's Song"	Altus; White; Jim Sanguinetti	9:27
4.	"Kill the King" (Rainbow cover)	Ritchie Blackmore; Ronnie James Dio; Cozy Powell	3:35

Side B
No.	Title	Writer(s)	Length
5.	"Fear of the Unknown"		7:08
6.	"Prisoners of Fate"		6:21
7.	"Morbid Curiosity"	Doug Piercy; White	6:28
8.	"Guitarmony" (instrumental)	Piercy	3:31
9.	"Mercy Is No Virtue"		6:29
Total length:			59:24

CD bonus track
No.	Title	Length
10.	"Timeless Cell of Prophecy"	5:20
Total length:		64:33

Japanese edition bonus track
No.	Title	Writer(s)	Length
11.	"Hellbound" (Tygers of Pan Tang cover)	Tygers of Pan Tang	3:40

== Credits ==
- Dave White – vocals
- Lee Altus – guitars
- Doug Piercy – guitars
- Marc Biedermann – bass
- Darren Minter – drums

Additional musicians

- Thaen Rasmussen – guitars on "Prisoners of Fate" and "Guitarmony"

Production

- Rob Beaton – producer, engineering, mixing
- Eddy Schreyer – mastering
- Jim "Watts" Vereecke – engineering (assistant)
- Larry Schalit – engineering (assistant)
- Pete Carlson – engineering (assistant)
- Rich Cavanaugh – engineering (assistant)
- Joe Giron – photography
- Patricia Mooney – art direction
- Alvin Petty – cover art, logo
