= David Wayne (disambiguation) =

David Wayne may refer to:

- David Wayne (1914–1995), American actor
- David Wayne (musician) (1958–2005), American singer

== See also ==
- David Wain (born 1969), American comedian and director
