= Play God =

Play God may refer to:

- Play God (album), a 1991 album by Reverend
- "Play God" (song), a 2017 song by Sam Fender
- Play God, a 2016 EP by Ani DiFranco
