= Live (Reverend EP) =

1992 EP by Reverend

EP (live) by Reverend
- Released: 1992
- Genres: Thrash metal, speed metal, power metal
- Length: 25:02
- Label: Charisma

Reverend chronology
Play God (1991)	Live (1992)	A Gathering of Demons (2001)

Professional ratings
Review scores
Source	Rating
Allmusic	3/5 stars

Live is the 1992 EP by heavy metal band Reverend. This is Reverend's only live offering to date. It is also the last release before the band temporarily broke up, although they reformed in 2000. Most of the songs on this EP come from Reverend's full-length releases, with one ("The Power of Persuasion") coming from Reverend's EP debut, 3 come from "World Won't Miss You" and 2 from "Play God".

For some reason the album cover only features David Wayne and Brian Korban. However all 5 members were exceptional on this evening David Wayne: vocals, Brian Korban: Guitars, Ernie Martinez: Guitar, Angelo Espino: Bass and Jason Ian: Drums. This album will be re-released on vic records in 2025 with all 5 members honored on the cover.

The whole show was proshot by the Jezebels owner without David's permission. They did 6 Reverend songs and 6 Metal Church tracks. Jezebels offered the vhs to David for $50 and he declined. It might have been taped over or it could be in someone's closet.

== Track listing ==
No.	Title	Writer(s)	Length
1.	"Gunpoint"	Korban, Wayne, O'Hara	4:20
2.	"World Won't Miss You"	Korban, Wayne, O'Hara	4:48
3.	"Scattered Wits"	Korban, Wayne, O'Hara	4:54
4.	"Butcher of Baghdad"	Korban, Wayne	3:56
5.	"Promised Land"	Korban, Wayne	3:02
6.	"The Power of Persuasion"	Korban, Wayne, O'Hara	4:02

== Lineup ==
- David Wayne: Vocals
- Brian Korban: Guitars
- Ernesto Martinez: Guitars
- Angelo Espino: Bass
- Jason Ian: Drums
