= Heathen (band) =

American thrash metal band

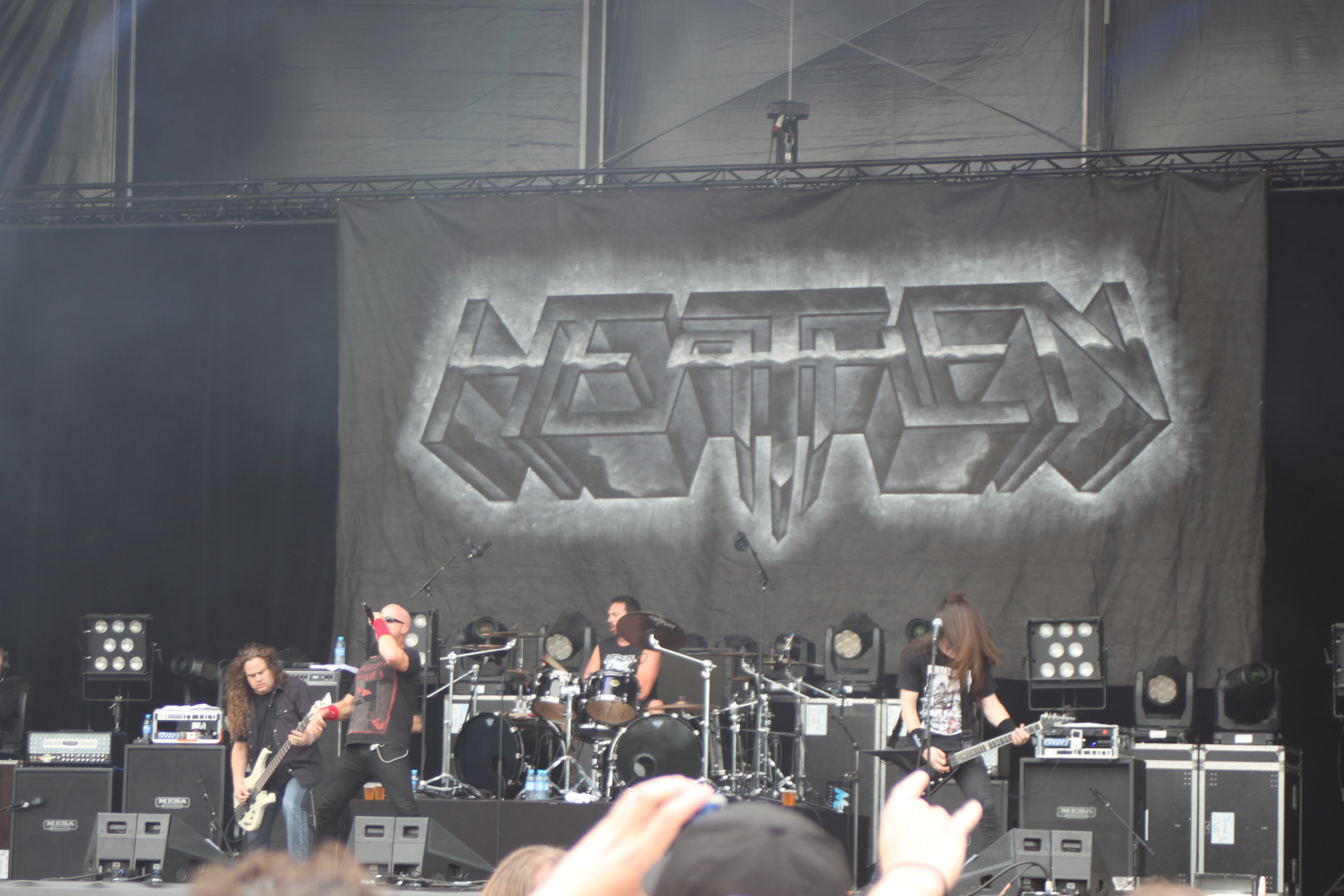
- Heathen performing at Hellfest 2013

Background information
- Origin: San Francisco, California, U.S.
- Genre: Thrash metal
- Years active: 1984–1993; 2001–present
- Labels: Combat; Roadrunner; Mascot; Nuclear Blast; Napalm
- Members: David White; Kragen Lum; Jason Mirza; Kyle Edissi; Blake Anderson
- Past members: Full list

Heathen is an American thrash metal band from the San Francisco Bay Area, active from 1984 to 1993 and from 2001 onwards. Despite lacking commercial success, the band is credited – alongside Exodus, Testament, Forbidden, Death Angel and Vio-lence – as a leader of the Bay Area thrash metal scene of the mid-to-late 1980s. To date, Heathen has released four studio albums: Breaking the Silence (1987), Victims of Deception (1991), The Evolution of Chaos (2009) and Empire of the Blind (2020). Guitarist Lee Altus' split with Heathen in 2026 left no original members in the current lineup, although he and frontman David White (who joined in 1985) have appeared on every album.

== History ==
=== Early history (1984–1987) ===
Heathen was formed in 1984 by guitarist Lee Altus and drummer Carl Sacco (formerly of Metal Church). They recruited lead vocalist Sam Kress and guitarist Jim Sanguinetti, who went on to form Mordred. Shortly after their first show in 1985, Kress and Sanguinetti left the group and were replaced by vocalist David White (formerly of Blind Illusion) and guitarist Doug Piercy (formerly of Anvil Chorus and Control). The band recruited bassist Eric Wong around this time. This lineup debuted in early 1986 and became prolific around the Bay Area. Their early style mixed thrash metal with NWOBHM-style vocals and arrangements, acoustic intros or outros, and fast-paced melodic shred solos.

Heathen released the Pray For Death demo, which, in 1987, resulted in their signing to Combat Records. Shortly after signing, Wong left the band to join Piranha, and was replaced on bass by former Griffin guitarist Mike "Yaz" Jastremski.

=== Breaking the Silence (1987–1990) ===
Heathen's debut album, Breaking the Silence, was released in 1987. The album was well received critically and featured a successful single, a cover of 1970s glam rock band Sweet's song "Set Me Free". The song received airplay on rock radio and MTV's Headbangers Ball. The band toured to support the album, including dates with Megadeth, King Diamond, Testament, Exodus, Savatage, Zoetrope, Dark Angel and Lizzy Borden, among others.

In 1988, Carl Sacco left due to musical differences. He was replaced by Darren Minter. Mike Jastremski left shortly after, and the band went through several bassists and vocalists between 1988 and 1991. In 1989, David White left the band due to personal and musical differences. For a few months, former Exodus vocalist Paul Baloff was the band's vocalist. They briefly toured with late Metal Church vocalist David Wayne. In late 1988, Rick Weaver was recruited from The Dispossessed, who had opened for the Midwest leg of the Heathen's national tour. He left amicably in 1989, citing creative differences, and White returned to Heathen later that year.

=== Victims of Deception and breakup (1991–1993) ===
To record their album Victims of Deception, Heathen recruited Blind Illusion's Marc Biedermann to play bass in the studio. The album was released in 1991 through Roadrunner Records. Victims of Deception was more technical than Breaking the Silence, featuring odd time signatures, complex riffs and songs, tempo and key changes, and longer song lengths, and is often described as progressive thrash metal, retaining little of the NWOBHM influence from its predecessor. It was critically acclaimed, though not as commercially successful as Breaking the Silence. The band's cover of Rainbow's "Kill the King" and original ballad "Prisoners of Fate" were released as singles and had minor rock radio airplay. The band toured to support the album, notably in Europe with Sepultura and Sacred Reich.

That year, Heathen found permanent bassist Randy Laire and toured extensively until Laire's death in a car accident. The band replaced him with Jason VieBrooks. Doug Piercy departed the band in 1992 and was replaced by Ira Black. The band planned to record a covers EP dedicated to Laire and White's deceased brother Jeffery, but the band went on hiatus in 1993.

=== Reunion (2001–2008) ===
Heathen reunited in 2001, with David White, Lee Altus, Ira Black, Mike Jastremski and Darren Minter, to play the Thrash of the Titans benefit concert for Chuck Billy's throat cancer and Chuck Schuldiner's brain cancer treatments. The concert was successful. In 2004, Jastremski left the band again, and was replaced by Ulysses Siren bassist Jon Torres. The compilation album Recovered was released on Relentless Metal Records, consisting of Victims of Deception-era demos and newly recorded cover songs. A three-song demo was released in August 2005.

Heathen recruited second guitarist Terry Lauderdale in 2005 and toured Europe. That year, Lee Altus joined Exodus but remained a member of Heathen. In November 2007, the band recruited Prototype guitarist Kragen Lum and Mark Hernandez to replace Darren Minter and Lauderdale, respectively. Minter returned to the band the following year.

=== The Evolution of Chaos (2009–2018) ===
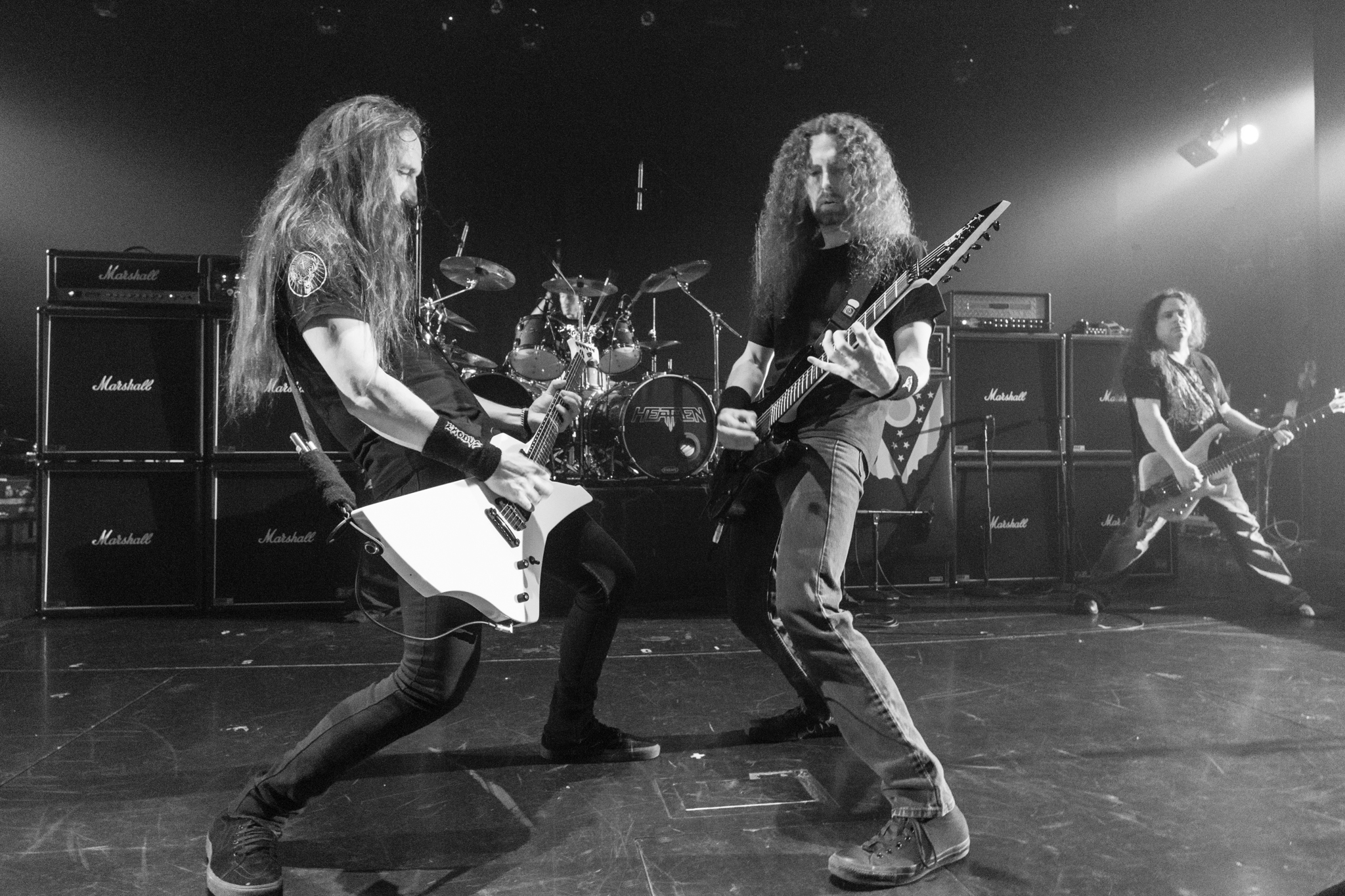
Heathen at 70000 Tons of Metal in 2015

Heathen released their first studio album in nearly two decades, The Evolution of Chaos, on King Records in Japan December 23, 2009, on Mascot Records in Europe January 25, 2010, and on Mascot Records USA in America in February 2010.

Heathen played at the Rock Hard Festival in Germany 2009 and supported Testament, Exodus, and Kreator at Thrash Domination in Kawasaki, Japan. In support of The Evolution of Chaos, Heathen toured in April and May 2010 after cancelling their planned March dates. In 2012, Heathen signed with Nuclear Blast Records. In the spring of 2013, the band announced drummer Darren Minter's departure. Former Evildead, Slayer and Testament drummer Jon Dette replaced him on the band's subsequent European tour.

Heathen took part in the European Thrashfest Classics 2011 European tour, featuring Sepultura, Exodus, Destruction and Mortal Sin. The tour concluded in Vienna, Austria on December 18, 2011.

=== Empire of the Blind (2019–2024) ===
On January 16, 2019, Heathen announced on their Facebook page that they had begun working on their fourth studio album.

On February 26, 2020, Heathen uploaded a flyer on their Facebook page, revealing the artwork and Empire of the Blind as the title of their fourth album. This flyer was available at the merchandise table during the European Bay Strikes Back tour featuring Testament, Exodus and Death Angel. On June 26, 2020, Heathen released "The Blight" as the lead single from Empire of the Blind, and announced that the album would be released on September 18. Due to the COVID-19 pandemic, the band was not able to tour in support of Empire of the Blind for nearly two years. Heathen toured Europe in June with Toxik, and along with Exodus and Death Angel, they toured there through July and August by supporting Testament on the latter's Titans of Creation tour. The band toured Europe in April 2023 with Overkill and Exhorder, and three bands toured the U.S. in July of that year. Heathen was scheduled to open for Metal Church on the Canadian leg of their Congregation of Annihilation tour in March 2024, but the tour was cancelled because of "an ongoing back issue" suffered by Metal Church guitarist Kurdt Vanderhoof.

Shortly before the release of Empire of the Blind, guitarist Kragen Lum mentioned that Heathen could work on a fifth album in 2021: "Every band on the planet is gonna want a tour next year. I think it's going to be a logistical problem in terms of the number of venues and dates and tour buses available and crew available. It's gonna be a challenge because everybody's gonna want to go out. We're just gonna do the very best that we can, and, and like I said, stay positive and promote the record. And if for some reason next year it proves to be a challenge in terms of touring or it's limited, then we're gonna probably start working on another record. It takes us long enough; we better start the running now!!"

=== Lifetime in Hell (2024–present) ===
Heathen announced in May 2024 that a new album would be released in 2025. Heathen entered the studio in June 2025 to begin recording the album, with producer Zeuss (who had worked on Empire of the Blind) and drum tracks recorded by Shadows Fall and former Overkill drummer Jason Bittner.

Heathen's first live album, Bleed the World: Live, recorded on the band's U.S. tour of 2023, was released on March 14, 2025.

On February 3, 2026, Heathen announced that they had signed to Napalm Records, and released the single "Never a God", a cover of a song by David White's early 1990s band Laughing Dead. The band announced a new lineup on that day, with drummer Blake Anderson and Kyle Edissi replacing Lee Altus on guitar, leaving the band with no original members.

On October 13, 2026, Heathen released its first song in over six years, "Escapegoat", as the lead single for their upcoming fifth studio album Lifetime in Hell. The album is due for release on February 19, 2027.

== Members ==
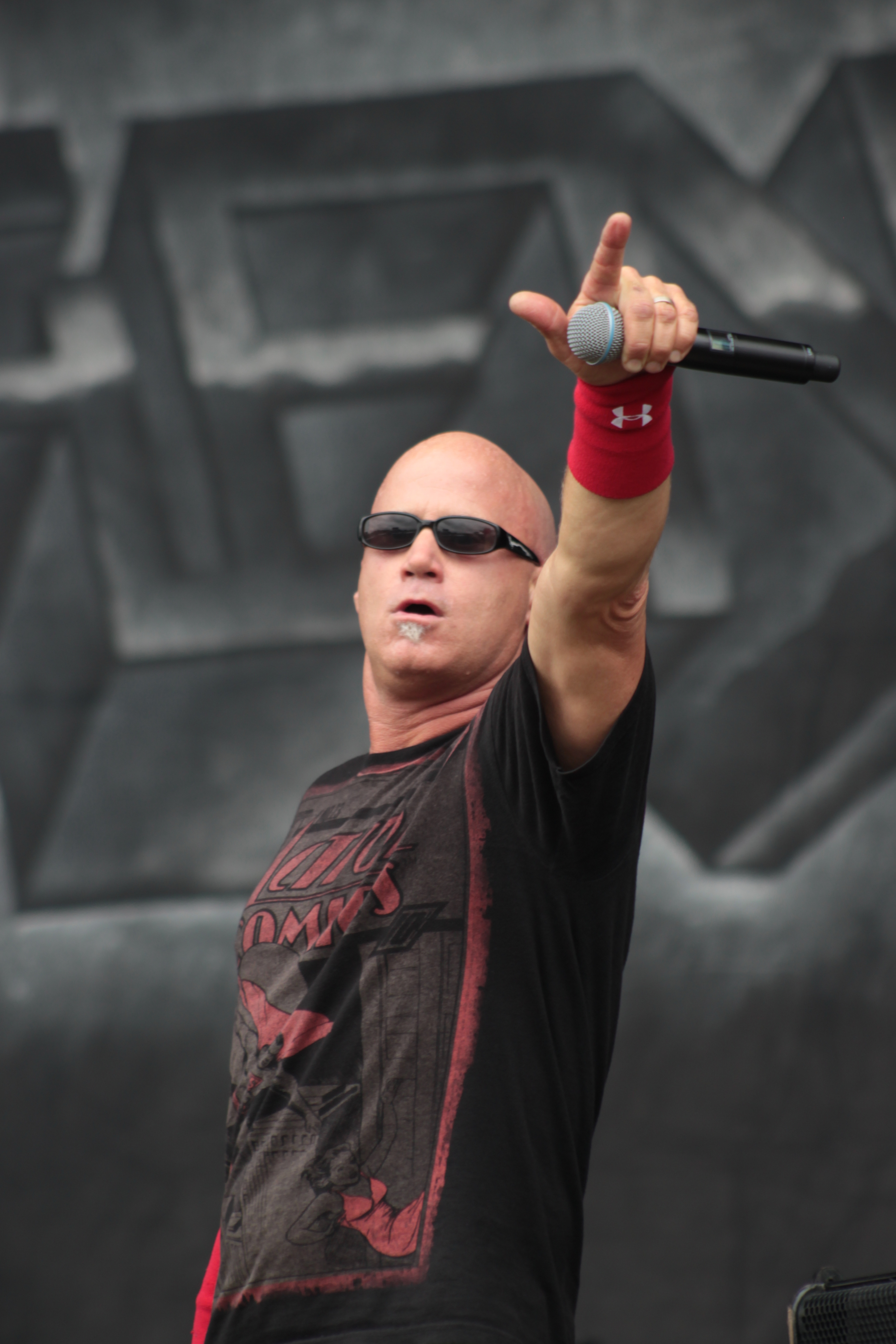
Lead singer Dave White

Current members

- David White – lead vocals (1985–1988, 1989–1993, 2001–present)
- Kragen Lum – guitars, backing vocals (2007–present)
- Jason Mirza – bass (2018–present)
- Kyle Edissi – guitars (2022–present)
- Blake Anderson – drums (2026–present)

== Discography ==
=== Studio albums ===
- Breaking the Silence (1987)
- Victims of Deception (1991)
- The Evolution of Chaos (2009)
- Empire of the Blind (2020)
- Lifetime in Hell (2027)

=== Compilation albums ===
- Recovered (2004)

=== Live albums ===
- Bleed the World: Live (2025)
