= The Sane Asylum =

Studio album by Blind Illusion
- Released: June 6, 1988
- Studios: Hyde Street Studios, San Francisco
- Genre: Thrash metal
- Length: 38:05
- Label: Combat
- Producers: Marc Biedermann, Kirk Hammett

Blind Illusion chronology
The Sane Asylum (1988)	Demon Master (2010)

Professional ratings
Review scores
Source	Rating
AllMusic	3.5/5 stars

The Sane Asylum is the debut album by the American thrash metal band Blind Illusion. It was originally released in 1988 through Combat Records. The album features guitarist Larry LaLonde and bassist Les Claypool before they went on to work on Primus. The musicians bring interesting elements of progressive rock to their thrash style, but the album was mixed and mastered like speed metal with limited dynamic range, which reduces the overall effectiveness. It was co-produced by Metallica lead guitarist Kirk Hammett.

== Track listing ==
All songs written by Marc Biedermann.

No.	Title	Length
1.	"The Sane Asylum"	1:39
2.	"Bloodshower"	3:50
3.	"Vengeance Is Mine"	5:28
4.	"Death Noise"	7:04
5.	"Kamakazi"	5:04
6.	"Smash the Crystal"	3:28
7.	"Vicious Vision"	6:14
8.	"Metamorphosis of a Monster"	6:38
Total length:		38:05

== Personnel ==
- Marc Biedermann – vocals, guitars, bass on "The Sane Asylum" and "Metamorphosis of a Monster", producer, mixing
- Larry LaLonde – guitars
- Les Claypool – bass
- Mike Miner – drums

Additional musicians

- Cristiana Lorenzo, Elisabetta Lorenzo, Francesca Lorenzo, Marisa Lorenzo, Michael Lorenzo, Jeff Wing – backing vocals on "Metamorphosis of a Monster"

Production

- Kirk Hammett – producer (uncredited)
- Mark Needham – engineer, recording, mixing
- Annamaria Scott – engineer, recording
