= World Won't Miss You =

Studio album LP by Reverend
- Released: 1990
- Genre: Thrash metal, speed metal
- Length: 44:40
- Label: Charisma
- Producer: Warren Croyle; Reverend

Reverend chronology
Reverend (1989)	World Won't Miss You (1990)	Play God (1991)

Professional ratings
Review scores
Source	Rating
Allmusic	3/5 stars
Select	3/5 medals

World Won't Miss You is the 1990 full-length debut by heavy metal band Reverend. This album was dedicated to the late Dave Prichard of Armored Saint and features Chris Goss (Masters of Reality), Rocky George (Suicidal Tendencies), and Damien Circle (Flower Leperds) as guests. A cover of Black Sabbath's Hand of Doom is included on the CD version as a bonus track.

== Track listing ==
All tracks are written by Brian Korban, David Wayne, and Dennis O'Hara except where noted.

No.	Title	Length
1.	"Remission"	4:29
2.	"Another Form of Greed"	4:05
3.	"Scattered Wits"	4:58
4.	"Desperate"	5:04
5.	"Leader of Fools"	3:44
6.	"World Won't Miss You"	4:53
7.	"Rude Awakening"	4:44
8.	"Gunpoint"	4:23
9.	"Killing Time"	4:31
10.	"Hand of Doom" (Black Sabbath cover) (CD bonus track)	6:56
11.	"11th Hour"	3:49

== Lineup ==
- David Wayne: Vocals
- Brian Korban: Guitars
- Stuart Fujinami: Guitars
- Dennis O'Hara: Bass
- Rick Basha: Drums

Guests:

- Chris Goss, Rocky George, and Damien Circle - "The Demonic Tabernacle Choir"
