= Evan McCaskey =

American guitarist (1965–1989)

- Born: July 7, 1965
- Origin: Point Richmond, Richmond, California, U.S.
- Died: September 28, 1989 (aged 24) Berkeley, California, U.S.
- Genres: Thrash metal, progressive metal
- Occupations: Musician, songwriter
- Instrument: Guitar
- Years active: 1983–1989

Evan McCaskey (July 7, 1965 – September 28, 1989) was an American guitarist who played for the bands Exodus and Blind Illusion.

McCaskey grew up in Point Richmond, California. Prior to joining the band Blind Illusion, he taught guitar lessons in his Point Richmond studio. He committed suicide on September 28, 1989, at the age of 24.
