= World Circus =

Studio album by Toxik
- Released: July 7, 1987
- Genre: Thrash metal
- Length: 37:32
- Label: Roadrunner
- Producer: Tom Morris

Toxik chronology
World Circus (1987)	Think This (1989)

Professional ratings
Review scores
Source	Rating
Allmusic	3/5 stars
Rock Hard	9/10 stars

World Circus is the debut studio album of the thrash metal band Toxik. It was released in 1987 on Roadrunner Records. The album was re-released by Metal Mind Productions and Displeased Records in 2007.

== Contemporary reviews ==
In the June 1988 issue of Circus magazine, music critic Paul Gallotta offered a mixed yet promising evaluation of the debut material, drawing a direct stylistic comparison to Metallica. The reviewer noted that if the latter were to replace their frontman with an anonymous, high-pitched vocalist, their sonic approach would closely resemble that of the New York-based quartet. While Gallotta argued that the musicians could benefit from external assistance regarding their songwriting department, the publication ultimately concluded that the record demonstrated significantly more artistic potential than the efforts of most of their contemporary peers.

== Track listing ==
All tracks are written by Josh Christian, except where noted.

No.	Title	Length
1.	"Heart Attack"	3:50
2.	"Social Overload" (Christian, Mike Sanders)	3:28
3.	"Pain and Misery"	3:16
4.	"Voices"	3:25
5.	"Door to Hell"	3:52
6.	"World Circus"	5:02
7.	"47 Seconds of Sanity / Count Your Blessings"	4:57
8.	"False Prophets"	2:22
9.	"Haunted Earth" (Christian, Sanders)	3:28
10.	"Victims"	3:59

Displeased Records reissue
No.	Title	Writer(s)	Length
11.	"Heart Attack" (Originally from the Wasteland 1986 Demo)		4:52
12.	"Haunted Earth" (Originally from the Wasteland 1986 Demo)		3:57
13.	"False Prophets" (Originally from the Wasteland 1986 Demo)		2:32
14.	"Wasteland" (Originally from the Wasteland 1986 Demo)		5:14
15.	"Skippy Windshield" (Originally from the Wasteland 1986 Demo)		0:08
16.	"Wasteland" (Originally from the Metal Massacre IX compilation)		5:08
17.	"Straight Razor"		2:37
18.	"Finer Points of Tragedy"		5:07
19.	"Parasite" (Kiss cover)	Ace Frehley	2:25
20.	"Radio Spot"		3:58
21.	"Radio Spot Fall '87"		3:47
22.	"Radio Spot with King Diamond"		1:19

Metal Mind reissue
No.	Title	Length
13.	"Machine Dream" (Demo)	4:03
14.	"Radio Interview (from 1989)"	3:54

== Personnel ==
- Mike Sanders - Vocals
- Josh Christian - Guitars
- Brian Bonini - Bass
- Tad Leger - Drums
