= Toxik =

American thrash metal band

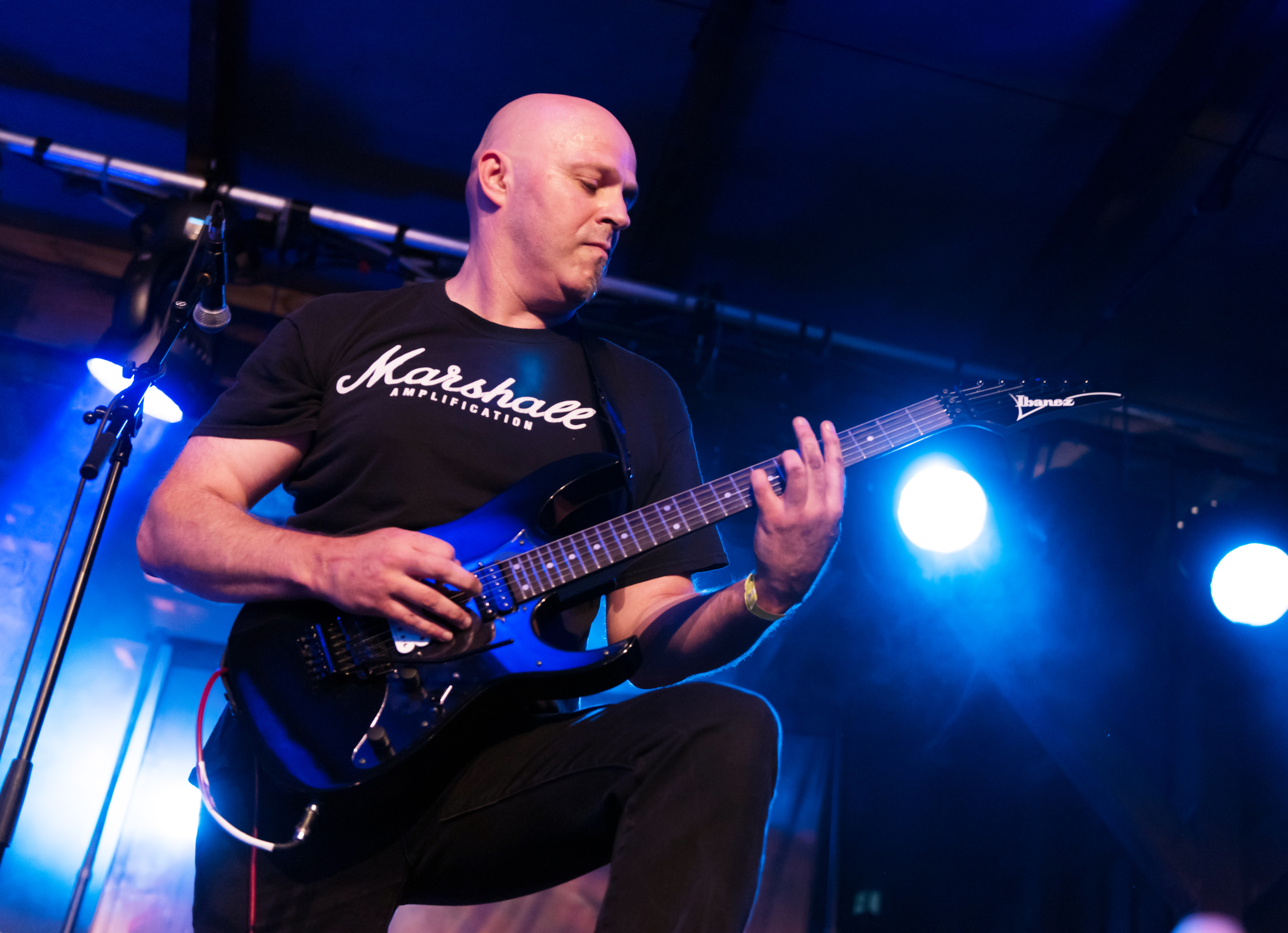
- Toxik at Headbangers Open Air 2017

Background information
- Origin: Peekskill, New York, U.S.
- Genre: Thrash metal
- Years active: 1985–1992; 2007; 2013–present
- Labels: Roadrunner; Displeased; Metal Mind; Massacre
- Members: Josh Christian; Eric van Druten; Jim D'Maria; Shane Boulos; Ron Iglesias
- Past members: John Donnelly; Ralph Santolla; Lee Erwin; Brian Bonini; Sal Dadabo; Tad Leger; Lou Caldarola; Jason Bittner; Mike Sanders; Bill Bodily
- Website: toxik.bandcamp.com

Toxik is an American thrash metal band formed in 1985 in Peekskill, New York. After breaking up in 1992 and briefly reuniting in 2007, the band reformed in 2013. Toxik has gone through several lineup changes, leaving guitarist Josh Christian as the only constant member. The band has released four studio albums to date, World Circus (1987), Think This (1989), Kinetic Closure (2018) and Dis Morta (2022).

In addition to thrash, the band has incorporated speed metal and progressive metal. They played heavy metal early in their career. They have drawn comparisons to Hades and Watchtower.

== History ==
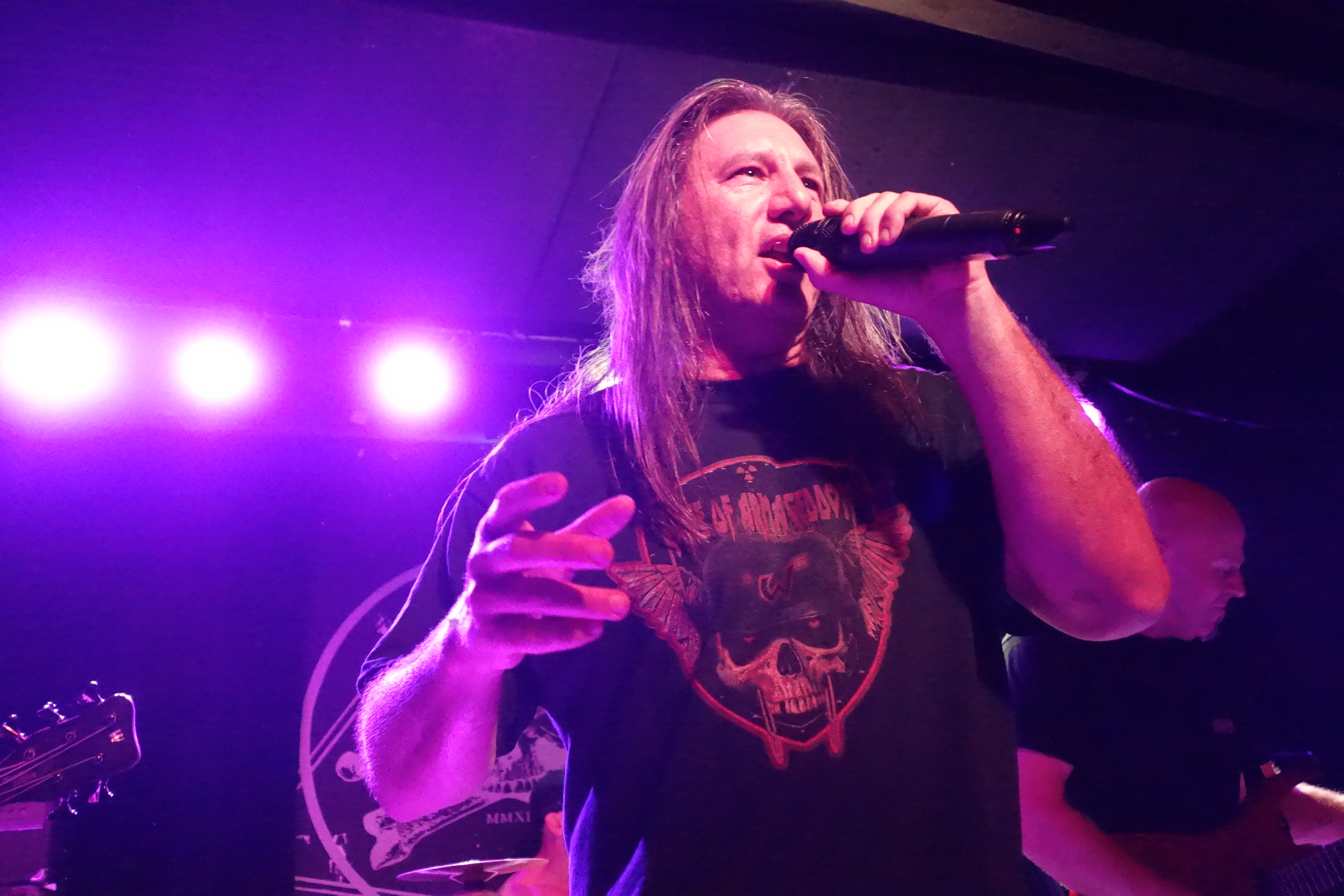
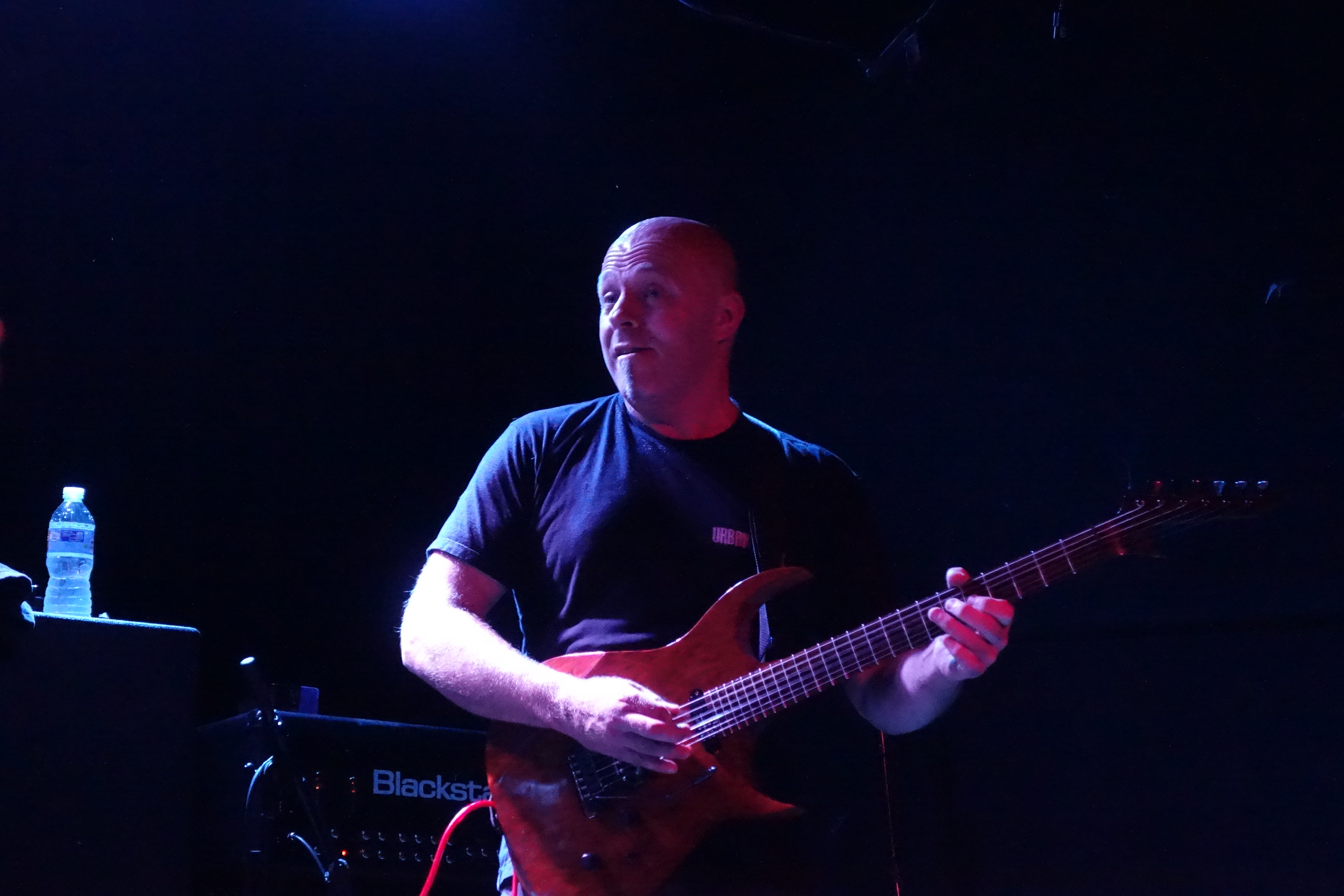
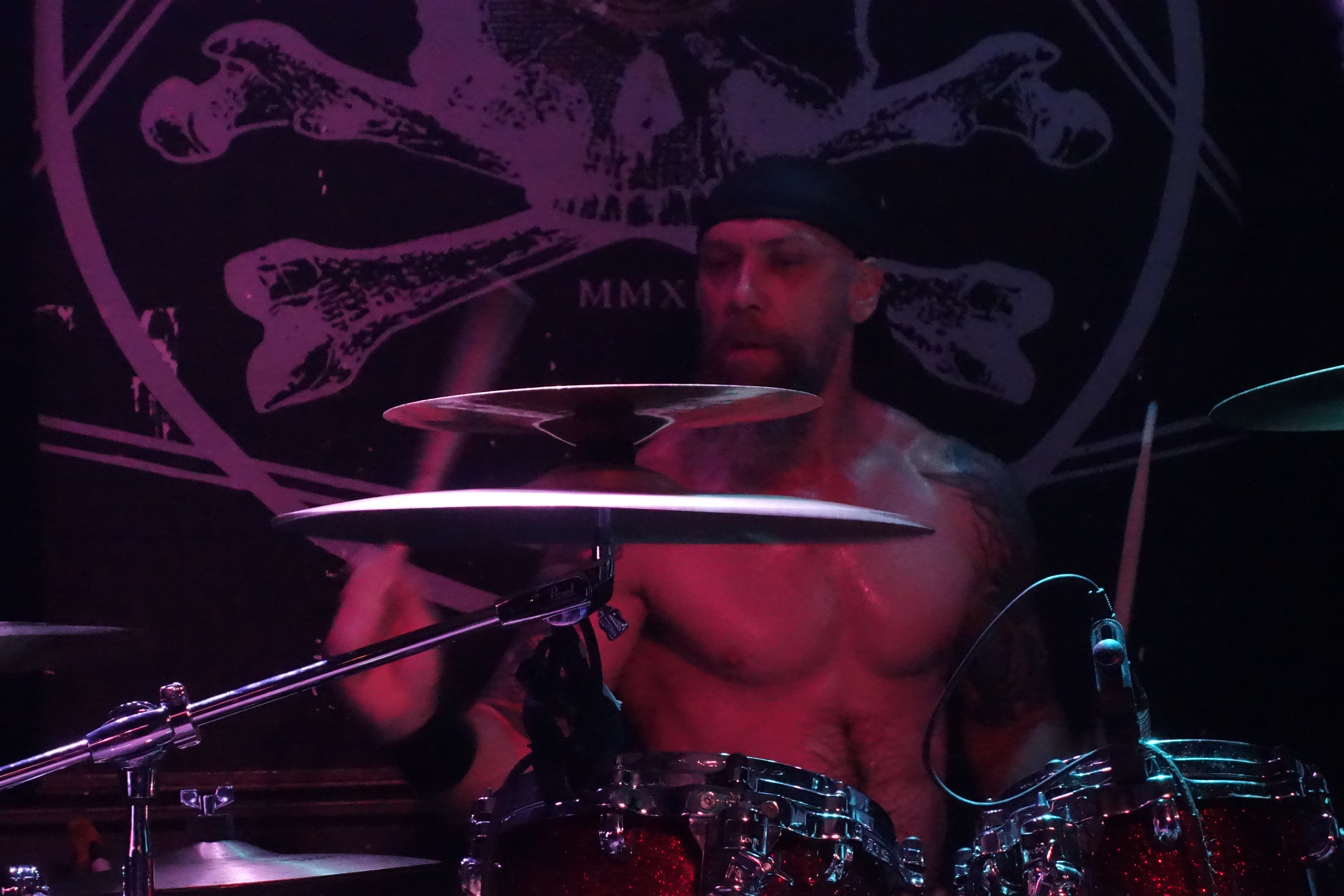
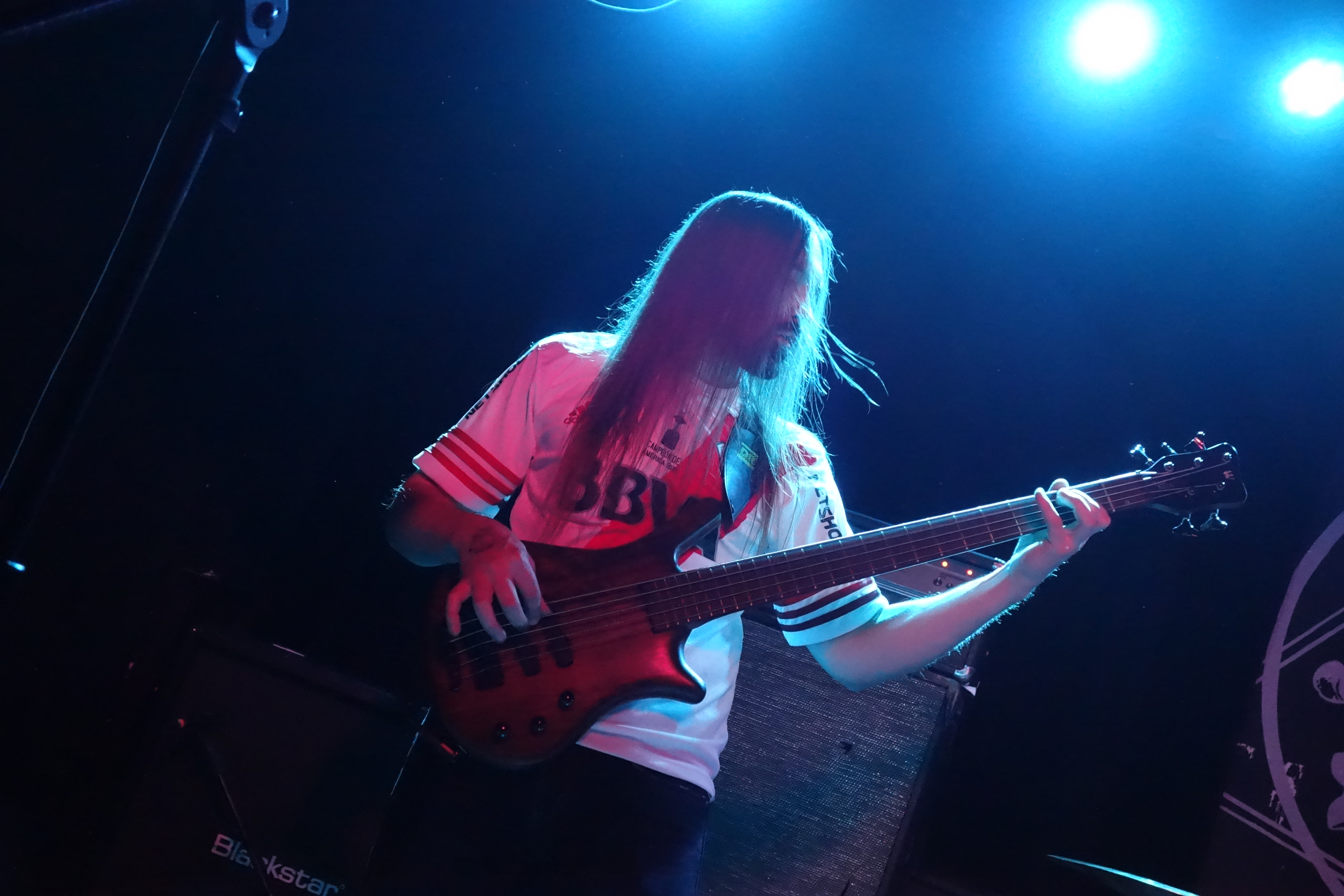
Toxik performing in 2015

=== Initial career (1985–1992) ===
Toxik was formed as "Tokyo" in 1985 by Joshua Christian and Lee Erwin. The band changed its name due to the threat of legal action from a band who had already registered the name. Christian and Erwin had played in numerous bands they created since 1980. The band's original "Tokyo" lineup consisted of Michael Sanders (vocals), Josh Christian (guitar), Lee Erwin (bass) and Sal Dadabo (drums). The line up was unstable and changed into the following year. During that year, Erwin, left Toxik citing severe clinical depression, to be replaced with Brian Bonini. Erwin went on to record several solo projects, including the Mad at the World album. He became a YouTuber under the name Doc Danger, hosting a music video show called The Doc Danger Music Show, as well as a guest on other channels. Sal Dadabo, the band's original drummer, was offered a touring contract with Twisted Sister that fell through, and left Toxik to be replaced with Tad Leger. This became the band's new line-up.

In 1987, Toxik signed to Roadrunner Records and released their first full-length album, World Circus. The album was an early example of progressive thrash metal. It charted on College Music Journal's "Best New Metal Album of the Year" for 1987. The band were offered the number nine slot on the Metal Blade Records "Metal Massacre" series with the song, "Wasteland". After touring for World Circus, vocalist Mike Sanders left Toxik for unknown reasons, to be replaced with Charlie Sabin.

Following the received attention for the release of their debut album, Toxik released their second full-length album in 1989 with Roadrunner Records entitled, Think This. After the album's release, Toxik hired guitarist John Donnelly to perform with them while touring. The success that resulted from Think This led Toxik to tour the album throughout the United States and Europe with several bands, including King Diamond, Sepultura, Prong, Exodus, Sacred Reich and Pantera. After years of touring, Toxik disbanded in 1992.

=== First reunion (2007–2010) ===
During the autumn of 2006, Displeased Records re-released Toxik's World Circus and Think This along with releases of previous releases from Gorguts, Sadus and Disincarnate. The World Circus rerelease included twelve bonus tracks and the Think This re-release included five bonus tracks.

In January 2007, Metal Mind Productions re-released limited edition versions of Toxik's World Circus and Think This. The rereleases are digitally remastered, featuring digipak editions of the albums.

During February 2007, Toxik announced their reformation as a band. The announcement consisted of the largely original line-up of Mike Sanders (vocals), Josh Christian (guitar), Brian Bonini (bass) and Lou Caldarola (drums). Tad Leger, one of the band's original drummers, is also in a band called Lucertola, as a guitarist. During August 2007, the band's bassist, Brian Bonini, left the new Toxik line-up, leaving Toxik with only three members.

Toxik announced a European tour in November 2007. The two-week tour was to have included performances at the Keep It True festival and the Ragers Elite festival in Germany. The band was scheduled to perform at the Keep It True Festival on November 3, 2007, when the band canceled the tour due to reasons disclosed by the event organizer, "The reason is that their Polish management booked a three week tour around the festival with eight day-offs in a row, which was [not] financially feasible for the band. Also, bassist Brian Bonini quit the band some weeks ago and they [Toxik] couldn't find a replacement for him until now." After the November tour cancellation, the band had not made any public appearances. Nonetheless, Toxik announced on their MySpace page that they were in the process of writing new material and would not tour until a new bassist was hired.

In December 2007, Displeased Records released Toxik's first live album set, entitled Dynamo Open Air 1988, which includes two live performances from 1988 and a limited CD and DVD package.

In July 2010, Toxik self-released Think Again on DVD. Containing a live set from 1989, a 2010 interview with Tad Leger, Josh Christian and Mike Sanders and a photo/poster gallery.

=== Second reunion and new releases (2013–present) ===
On January 8, 2014, it was revealed on Bittner's Facebook fan page that the name of the third Toxik album was In Humanity. A spring 2014 release was expected. However, the album's release date was pushed back to 2016, before being pushed back to 2017.

On July 10, 2017, Toxik announced that they would release the EP Breaking Class on August 4, and premiered their first song in 28 years, "Stand Up", that same day.

On April 27, 2018, Toxik released their newest box set III Works, featuring In Humanity recording sessions, Breaking Class EP with three additional tracks from this EP's sessions and new disc Kinetic Closure featuring vocalist Ron Iglesias.

Continuing with Iglesias on vocals, Toxik added a second guitarist, Eric van Druten, in 2019. There had not been any news on a new album until November 2020, when guitarist Josh Christian announced on Facebook that he was working on new tracks for the follow-up to Think This. Christian confirmed in a February 2022 interview with the Italian website Metal Skunk that Dis Morta was the official title of their third album. Dis Morta was released on August 5, 2022, by Massacre Records, and two months prior to its release, Toxik toured Europe by supporting Heathen on their Empire of the Blind tour.

== Band members ==
=== Current members ===
- Josh Christian – guitars (1985–1992, 2007, 2013–present)
- Jim DeMaria – drums (2015–present)
- Shane Boulos – bass (2017–present)
- Ron Iglesias – vocals, guitars (2018–present)
- Eric van Druten – guitars (2019–present)

=== Former members ===
- Mike Sanders – vocals (1985–1988, 2007, 2013–2016)
- Charlie Sabin – vocals (1988–1992, 2017)
- Ralph Santolla - guitars (2013-2014; died 2018)
- John Donnelly – guitars (1988–1992)
- Lee Erwin – bass (1985)
- Brian Bonini – bass (1985–1992, 2007)
- Bill Bodily – bass (2013–2017)
- Sal Dadabo – drums (1985)
- Tad Leger – drums (1985–1992)
- Lou Caldarola – drums (2007)
- Jason Bittner – drums (2013–2014)

=== Timeline ===
- Note: Toxik was inactive from 1992 to 2007, and again from 2007 to 2013.

== Discography ==
=== Studio albums ===
- World Circus (1987, Roadrunner)
- Think This (1989, Roadrunner)
- Kinetic Closure (2018, SubLevel Records)
- Dis Morta (2022, Massacre Records)

=== EPs ===
- In Humanity (2014)
- Breaking Class (2017)

=== Live albums ===
- Dynamo Open Air 1988 (2007, DVD, Displeased)
- Think Again (2010, DVD, self-released)

=== Compilation albums ===
- This Is Toxik (2009, Roadrunner)
- III Works (2018)
- Wasteland (2021)
