= Breaking Class =

EP by Toxik
- Released: August 4, 2017
- Genre: Thrash metal, heavy metal
- Length: 12:35

Toxik chronology
Think This (1989)	Breaking Class (2017)	Dis Morta (2022)

Breaking Clas$ is an EP by American thrash metal band Toxik, released on August 4, 2017. Released in anticipation of their upcoming third album, this three-track EP marks Toxik's first studio recording since Think This (1989), and their first release with drummer Jim DeMaria as the replacement of original member Tad Leger, as well as bassist Shane Boulos (Militia Vox). It is also the band's first release not to feature a different singer, as Charlie Sabin had appeared on Think This.

== History ==
After breaking up in 1992 and briefly reuniting in 2007, Toxik announced their second reunion in January 2013, and began working on a new album. On June 4, 2013, Toxik posted a fifty-second snippet of a pre-mix demo of their first song in 24 years "Crooked Crosses". On January 8, 2014, the artwork and title of the album were revealed on Bittner's Facebook fan page. It was also revealed that Toxik had "started to mix a few songs so this should be out by mid year." By April, Toxik had begun mixing In Humanity, and later that month, the band embarked on the Circus Continues European tour. In December 2014, Toxik posted two new songs from In Humanity on their YouTube channel, "Too Late" and "Crooked Crosses", which were mixed and mastered by Tom Morris of Morrisound Recording in Tampa, Florida.

On July 10, 2017, Toxik announced that they would release the EP Breaking Class on August 4, and premiered their first song in 28 years, "Stand Up", that same day.

== Track listing ==
No.	Title	Length
1.	"Stand Up"	3:55
2.	"Breaking Class"	3:40
3.	"Psyop"	5:00

== Personnel ==
- Charlie Sabin – vocals
- Josh Christian – guitar
- Shane Boulos - bass
- Jim DeMaria – drums
