= Reverend (band) =

American heavy metal band

- Origin: Los Angeles, U.S.
- Genres: Thrash metal; speed metal; power metal
- Years active: 1989–1994; 2000–2002; 2005–2010; 2019-present
- Labels: Caroline; Charisma; Independent Records; Neck Damage Records; Divebomb Records; VIC Records
- Spinoff of: Metal Church; Heretic
- Members: Bobby Lucas; Bill Rhynes; Allan Johnson
- Past members: See below

Reverend is an American heavy metal band formed in 1989 by ex-Metal Church vocalist David Wayne, who took the band's name from his own moniker, which he acquired as the frontman of Metal Church. Initially formed in L.A, Reverend would consist of guitarists Brian Korban and Stuart Fujinami, bassist Dennis O'Hara, all formerly of Heretic, and Ray Gunn drummer Scott Vogel. This lineup of the band would release the Reverend 1989 EP. Drummer Rick Basha would replace Vogel for the band's first studio album World Won't Miss You. Fujinami, O'Hara, and Basha would leave following Reverend's 1990 tour. Angelo Espino would replace O'Hara on bass, and Jason Ian (Scott Ian's brother) replaced Basha on drums, respectively, for Reverend's second studio album Play God and the band's Live 1992 EP along with second guitarist Ernesto F. Martinez. After Reverend's recording contract with Charisma Records ended, Korban, Espino, and Ian would form the band Seed while Wayne would move back to Washington. He would assemble another incarnation of Reverend with Bill Rhynes on guitar, Chuck Smith on bass, and Jamie Northop on drums. The Washington-based personnel of Reverend would record the 1993 previously unreleased Soul Eater album that would later officially be released by VIC Records in 2026. Drummer Todd Stotz would replace Northop in late 1993. Guitarist Brian Porter and bassist James Cooper would replace Rhynes and Smith in 1994, respectively. Reverend would disband in 1994 due to creative differences. Following the 1999 Metal Church Masterpeace tour, Wayne would bring back Reverend in 2000 with drummer Todd Stotz, guitarist Chris Nelson, and bassist John Stahlman. This lineup of the band would record the 2001 EP A Gathering of Demons. When touring for the EP, Byfist guitarists Nacho Vera and Davey Lee would replace Nelson, and bassist Jay Wagner initially replaced Stahlman before ultimately being replaced by Pete Perez in 2002. The group started work on a new album entitled Resurrection or Resurrected, but it was never finished. Reverend would play their final show with Wayne on December 13, 2002. In June 2004, Wayne planned to relaunch Reverend, but it never happened due to Wayne being involved in a serious car crash. In December 2004, Wayne was contacted by Texas Metal Health for Reverend to appear at the Leukemia and Lymphoma Society benefit concert. He decided to bill the performance as David Wayne's Metal Church instead for publicity.

After Wayne's death in May 2005, Reverend has gone through several lineup changes, with the most recent personnel being vocalist Bobby Lucas, guitarist Bill Rhynes, bassist Allan Johnson, and drummer Joe Moore.

== History ==
=== The L.A Reverend (1989–1992) ===
Following his departure from Metal Church, David Wayne would relocate to L.A. Initially wanting to link up with Randy Piper's (formerly of W.A.S.P.) band, Animal, he would eventually join the ex-members of second Metal Church singer Mike Howe's old band, Heretic, to form the band Reverend after hearing their songs played on a tape recorder at a Denny's restaurant. Wayne described the ordeal as a "cosmic joke on all of us". Reverend's first lineup would consist of Heretic guitarists Brian Korban and Stuart Fujinami, bassist Dennis O'Hara, and Ray Gunn drummer Scott Vogel. The group would record a 4-track demo in O'Hara's grandmother's garage in search of a record deal. The band would sign with Caroline for the release of Reverend 1989 EP. The EP led Reverend to sign a larger album deal with Charisma. Vogel would be replaced by drummer Rick Basha during the recording sessions for their first studio album World Won't Miss You released August 21, 1990. The band would make a music video for the track Scattered Wits. Reverend toured from October 23, 1990 through December 14, 1990 in support of the album. Fujinami, O'Hara, and Basha would leave the band after the 1990 World Won't Miss You tour. Angelo Espino would replace O'Hara on bass, and Jason Ian (Scott Ian's brother) replaced Basha on drums, respectively. The group would record Reverend's second studio album Play God in August 1991. According to guitarist Brian Korban, David Wayne appeared alienated from Reverend during the Play God era. Problems with Wayne and the band's management caused the group to break up following a live performance on January 25, 1992. Charisma released part of this concert in the summer of 1992 as Live purely as a contractual obligation. Once Reverend's contract ended, Korban, Espino, and Ian would form the band Seed while Wayne would move back to Washington.

=== The Yakima, Washington Reverend (1993–1994) ===
While working security at a bar in Yakima, Washington called the Little Dutch Inn, David Wayne would assemble a new incarnation of Reverend that included guitarist Bill Rhynes, bassist Chuck Smith, and drummer Jamie Northop. The band had an agreement with the owner to rehearse and work on new Reverend songs when they were not acting as security in the bar. This version of the band would record the previously unreleased 1993 Soul Eater album that would later be officially released by VIC Records in 2026. In late 1993, drummer Todd Stotz replaced Northop. In 1994, guitarist Brian Porter replaced Rhynes, and bassist James Cooper replaced Smith, respectively. Wayne would disband Reverend in 1994 due to creative differences with the other band members, and decline a $25,000 record offer with Massacre Records.

=== The Seattle, Washington Reverend (2000-2002) ===
After Metal Church's Masterpeace tour in 1999, David Wayne would bring back Reverend in 2000 with drummer Todd Stotz returning, guitarist Chris Nelson, and bassist John Stahlman. The band would record the self-released 2001 EP A Gathering of Demons on their own label Neck Damage Records. The EP featured an altered rendition of Metal Church's Fake Healer titled Legion with different lyrics that Wayne wrote before he departed from the band in 1987. Despite Wayne giving credit to his Metal Church bandmates, they were not pleased with his decision to release the track Legion. Byfist guitarists Nacho Vera and Davey Lee would replace Nelson, and bassist Jay Wagner replaced Stahlman, respectively, for touring supporting A Gathering Of Demons. Bassist Pete Perez replaced Wagner in 2002, and the group started work on a new album entitled Resurrection or Resurrected, but it was never finished. Reverend would play their final show with Wayne on December 13, 2002.

=== Unsuccessful Reverend Reunions (2004-2005) ===
In June 2004, Wayne planned to relaunch Reverend with Nacho Vera's brother Jesse Vera on drums, and bassist Brendon Kyle replacing Stotz and Perez, respectively, for a two-day show with Flotsam and Jetsam and Exciter in San Antonio, TX. However, the show never happened due to a severe car accident Wayne was involved in. In December 2004, Wayne was contacted by Texas Metal Health for Reverend to appear at the Leukemia and Lymphoma Society benefit concert on March 5, 2005, in San Antonio, Texas. He decided to bill the performance as David Wayne's Metal Church instead for publicity. It would be Wayne's final live performance.

=== Post David Wayne Reverend (2005-Present) ===
Following Wayne's death in May 2005, guitarist Davey Lee stated that Wayne had signed over all the rights to Reverend, and that his wishes were for the band to continue even after his death. In 2005, the lineup for Reverend consisted of guitarists Davey Lee and Nacho Vara, drummer Jesse Vara, and bassist Brendon Kyle. Wayne's brother, Dennis, would audition as a singer in October 2005, but the band would choose Michael Lance as Reverend's new lead vocalist in June 2006. In 2006, Reverend started working on a new album with singer Michael Lance. Possible names for the new album included Resurrected, Resurrection, or Crossing Over. The album would include the last song penned by David Wayne, With This Needle I Thee Wed. Other tracks planned for the album were In the End, Epitaph, Prelude, Darkened Horizon, Ships of Illusion, Visions, Universal Metal, River of Hate (Styx), and Unconscious Suicide. In 2008, Kyle would enlist in the United States Air Force and be replaced by bassist Mike Falletta, respectively. In 2009, Robb Steele and drummer Dave Galbert would replace Lance and Jesse Vara, respectively. On October 1, 2010, Reverend guitarist Davey Lee died. Reverend would dissolve following Lee's death, and Nacho Vara would go back to Byfist in October 2012. In 2019, Reverend's former guitarist Bill Rhynes would bring the band back with a new lineup consisting of vocalist Bobby Lucas, bassist Allan Johnson, and drummer Joe Moore. Interestingly, Byfist's 2020 album In The End featured the tracks Universal Metal, In the End, Unconscious Suicide, With This Needle I Thee Wed, Ship of Illusion, and Epitaph from the unreleased Reverend album but with Raul Garcia on vocals instead of Michael Lance. Notably, the album also includes a cover of Reverend's Scattered Wits. Reverend drummer Joe Moore would die in 2022.

== Members ==
=== Current line-up ===
- Bobby Lucas - vocals (2019–present)
- Bill Rhynes - guitars (1993-1994, 2019–present)
- Allan Johnson - bass (2019–present)

=== Former members ===
Vocals

- David Wayne (1989–2002; died 2005)
- Michael Lance (2006–2009)
- Robb Steele (2009–2010)

Bass

- Dennis O'Hara (1989–1991)
- Angelo Espino (1991–1992)
- Chuck Smith (1993–1994)
- James Cooper (1994)
- John Stahlman (2000–2001)
- Jay Wegener (2001–2002)
- Pete Perez (2002)
- Brendon Kyle (2005–2008)
- Mike Falletta (2008–2010)

Guitars

- Brian Korban (1989–1992)
- Stuart Fujinami (1989–1991)
- Ernesto F. Martinez (1991–1992)
- Brian Porter (1994)
- Chris Nelson (2000–2001)
- Nacho Vara (2001–2010)
- Davey Lee (2001–2010; died 2010)

Drums

- Scott Vogel (1989–1990)
- Rick Basha (1990–1991)
- Jason Ian Rosenfeld (1991–1992)
- Jamie Northop (1993)
- Todd Stotz (1993-1994, 2000-2002)
- Jesse Vara (2005–2009)
- Dave Galbert (2009–2010)
- Joe Moore (2019–2022; died 2022)

== Discography ==
- World Won't Miss You (1990)
- Play God (1991)
- Soul Eater (2026)

=== EPs ===
- Reverend (1989)
- Live (1992)
- A Gathering of Demons (2001)
