= Demon Master =

Studio album by Blind Illusion
- Released: July 2010
- Genres: Heavy metal, hard rock
- Length: 45:08
- Label: Demon Master

Blind Illusion chronology
The Sane Asylum (1988)	Demon Master (2010)	Wrath Of The Gods (2022)

Professional ratings
Review scores
Source	Rating
Metal Psalter	3.5/5 stars

Demon Master is the second full-length album by American heavy metal band Blind Illusion. The band changed to a softer hard rock/heavy metal sound with this release. It came 22 years after their first album, The Sane Asylum.

== Track listing ==
No.	Title	Length
1.	"Merger"	2:56
2.	"Mahakala"	2:32
3.	"Heaven's Devils"	5:00
4.	"Precursor – Demon Master"	9:55
5.	"Gargantuan"	5:33
6.	"Midnight in China"	3:49
7.	"Cajun Fang"	5:53
8.	"Storm Cloud"	9:27

== Personnel ==
- Marc Biedermann – vocals, guitar
- Danny Harcourt – guitar
- Robert Nystrom – drums
- Jon Brunner – producer, engineer
