= Reverend (EP) =

EP (studio) by Reverend
- Released: 1989
- Genre: Thrash metal, heavy metal
- Length: 17:15
- Label: Caroline
- Producer: Warren Croyle; Reverend

Reverend chronology
Reverend (1989)	World Won't Miss You (1990)

Professional ratings
Review scores
Source	Rating
Allmusic	3/5 stars

Reverend is the 1989 EP debut by the American heavy metal band of the same name. This was Reverend's first studio EP.

== Track listing ==
All tracks are written by Brian Korban, David Wayne, and Dennis O'Hara.

No.	Title	Length
1.	"Power of Persuasion"	3:57
2.	"Dimensional Confusion"	4:29
3.	"Wretched Excess"	3:08
4.	"Ritual"	5:41

== Lineup ==
- David Wayne: Vocals
- Brian Korban: Guitars
- Stuart Fujinami: Guitars
- Dennis O'Hara: Bass
- Scott Vogel: Drums
