= Lee Altus =

Ukrainian-American guitarist (born 1966)

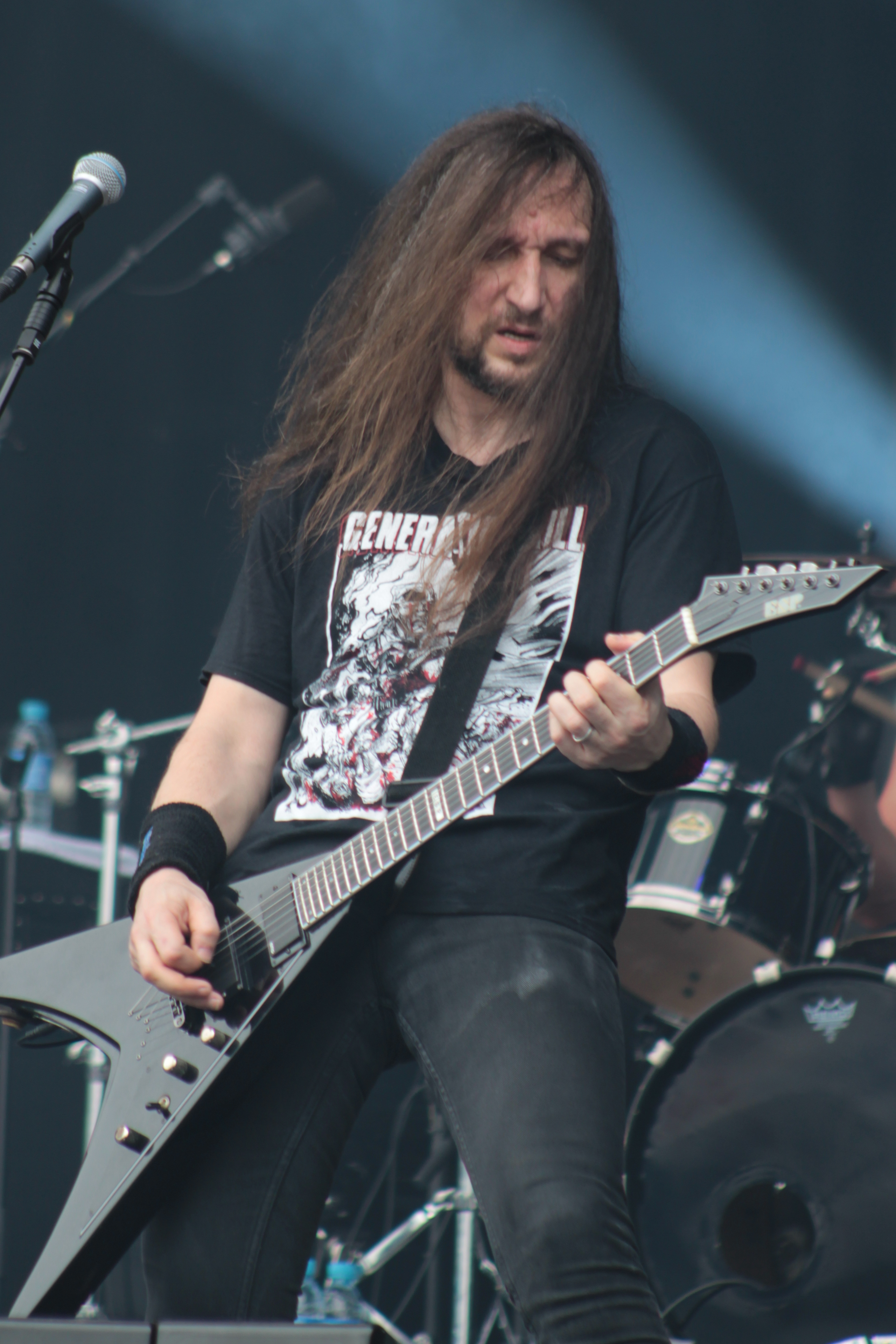
- Altus with Heathen at Hellfest 2013

Background information
- Born: Leonid Altus; May 13, 1966 (age 59); Odessa, Ukrainian SSR, Soviet Union
- Genres: Thrash metal; heavy metal
- Occupations: Musician; songwriter
- Instrument: Guitar
- Years active: 1984–present
- Member of: Exodus
- Formerly of: Die Krupps; Angel Witch; Heathen

Lee Altus (Ukrainian: Лі Альтус, romanized: Li Altus) (born Leonid Altus, May 13, 1966) is a Ukrainian-American guitarist who has been member of the thrash metal band Exodus since 2005, and was a founding member of Heathen.

== Career ==
Altus first came to public attention in the mid-1980s with his original band, Heathen. He served as the principal songwriter and a founding member of Heathen playing on all four of their LPs, Breaking the Silence, Victims of Deception, The Evolution of Chaos and Empire of the Blind. In 1990, Altus was considered for the position in Megadeth vacated by Jeff Young, but declined, and the job was given instead to Marty Friedman. He later became a permanent member of the thrash metal band Exodus.

After Heathen broke up in 1992, Altus moved to Germany along with his fellow ex-Heathen members Doug Piercy and Darren Minter. Altus and Minter played in the industrial metal group Die Krupps for much of the remainder of the 1990s. He also participated in a reunited version of Angel Witch.

In 2001, Altus reunited Heathen along with Minter, vocalist Dave White, bassist Mike Jastremski and guitarist Ira Black. The band put out an EP entitled Recovered, made up of rare material and, with a new second guitarist and bassist, in 2010 released The Evolution of Chaos, followed a decade later by Empire of the Blind (2020). By February 2026, Altus and Heathen had parted ways, with Kyle Edissi (who had filled in for him on tour since 2022) as his replacement.

Altus has been a member of Exodus since 2005, replacing longtime guitarist Rick Hunolt. To date, Altus has performed on seven studio albums with Exodus: Shovel Headed Kill Machine (2005), The Atrocity Exhibition (2007), Let There Be Blood (2008), Exhibit B: The Human Condition (2010), Blood In, Blood Out (2014), Persona Non Grata (2021), and Goliath (2026).

== Personal life ==
Lee was born Leonid Altus on May 13, 1966 in Odesa, Ukrainian SSR, Soviet Union (now Ukraine). Lee is a longtime fan of the Philadelphia Flyers NHL franchise, including wearing Flyers shirts while headlining the 2020 70,000 Tons of Metal festival.

== Equipment ==
Altus currently endorses ESP Guitars, though he used to play Jackson King V guitars. Altus was a long time user of Mesa/Boogie Amplifiers as well, but is currently an ENGL endorsee.
