= Blind Illusion =

American progressive thrash metal band

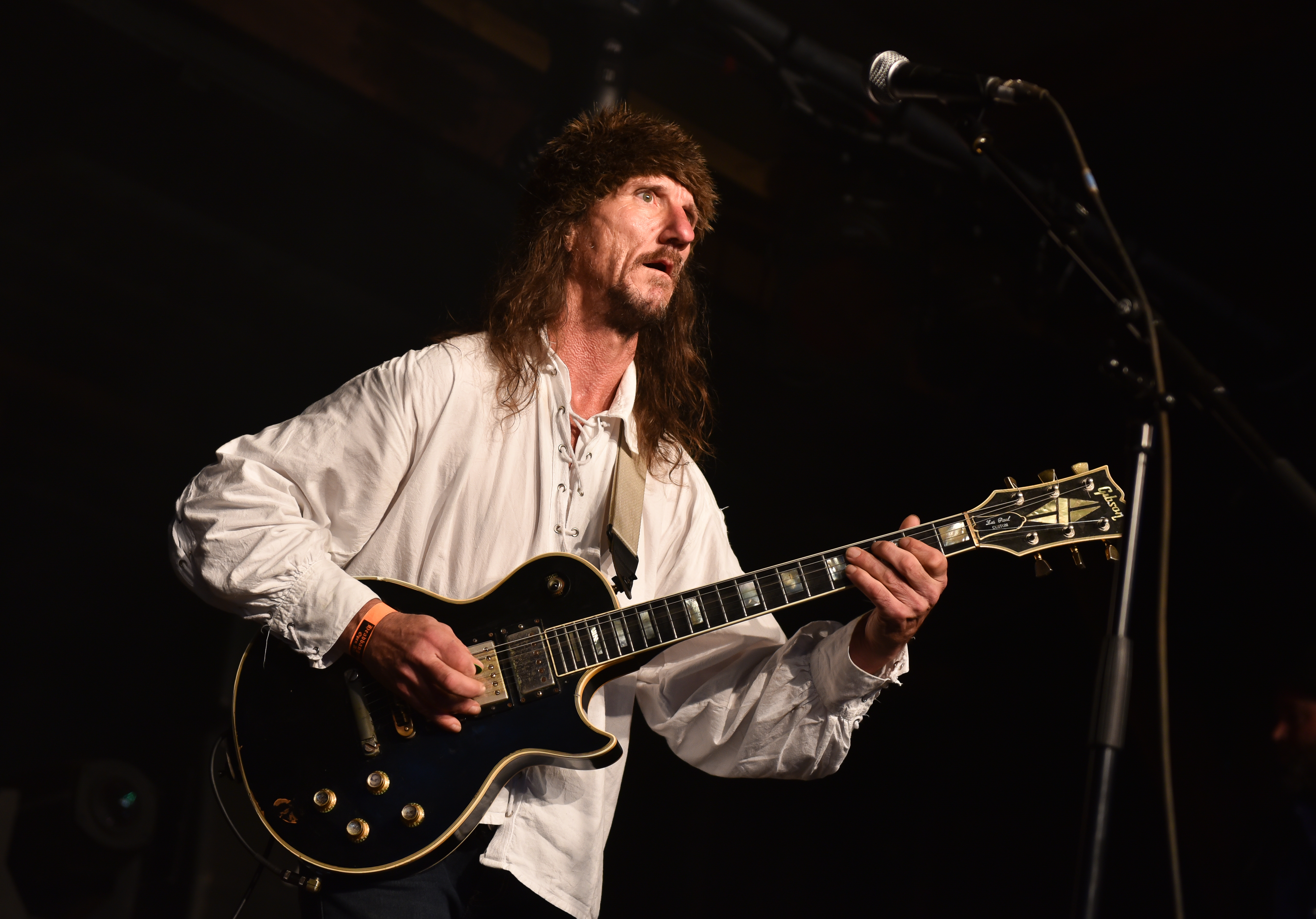
- Mark Biedermann - Headbangers Open Air 2017

Background information
- Origin: Richmond, California, U.S.
- Genre: Progressive thrash metal
- Years active: 1978–1989, 2009–present
- Labels: Combat, World in Sound Germany
- Members: Mark Biedermann; Martin Lacour; Avery Thurman; Phil Cosentini
- Past members: Mark Strausberg; Vern McElroy; Wes Anderson; David White; Hans Larson; Pat Woods; John Marshall; Larry LaLonde; Evan McCaskey; Les Claypool; Chris Olsen; Gene Gilson; Bryan Kehoe; Bret Hern; Victor Griffith; Sean Perry; Bill Ticson; Erik Cruze; Mike Miner; Ben Hevoroh; Harald Oimoen; Brian Schwarts; Tom Gears; Doug Piercy; Andy Galeon
- Website: blindillusionofficial.com

Blind Illusion is an American progressive thrash metal band from Richmond, California. The band's original line-up formed in 1978 by lead guitarist and songwriter Mark Biedermann. Since Blind Illusion's inception the band has had several line-up changes, with Biedermann remaining the only constant member. Blind Illusion is also notable for featuring Les Claypool and Larry LaLonde, both later of Primus, who performed bass and guitar respectively on their 1988 debut album The Sane Asylum.

After a 20-year hiatus, Biedermann reformed Blind Illusion in 2009, and they have since released two more albums: Demon Master (2010) and Wrath of the Gods (2022). They also released an EP in February 2019, titled 2018, which also includes remakes of some of their older songs.

== History ==
Blind Illusion was formed in 1978 by De Anza High School students Mark Biedermann, on guitar and vocals, Les Claypool, on bass, and Bret Hern, on drums. By that time, Biedermann had been writing his own music from a young age, and original songs were a priority for the new band from the beginning. The band's earliest sound was musically rooted in progressive rock, with Biedermann citing as his main inspirations Rush, King Crimson, Jethro Tull, Scorpions, Mahavishnu Orchestra, Frank Marino, Black Sabbath, and Blue Öyster Cult. They soon added vocalist David White. Claypool left the band in 1979 and was replaced by bassist Chris Olsen. This line-up would play outdoor parties and self promoted multi-band concerts around the area since all of the members were too young to play in clubs. They also recorded several demo songs during this period. Brian Kehoe joined as a second guitarist and Les Claypool returned as well to record another demo tape of the songs "On Death's Bed" and "Kamikaze" in 1980.

By 1983, Blind Illusion were making inroads into the same venues that featured many bands in the developing Bay Area thrash scene. By this time, Biedermann and White were joined by Craig Maracich on bass, Evan McCaskey on guitar, Vic Griffith on drums and Ben Heveroh on keyboards. This version recorded another demo tape and was fairly stable for a time, but the band was beset by line-up changes going forward.

The 1985 version of the band (Biedermann, White, Gene Gilson on bass, Mike Miner on drums) recorded the "Trilogy of Terror" demo which was produced by Biedermann's old classmate, Metallica guitarist Kirk Hammett. Soon after, David White would leave to join Heathen and Biedermann took over on vocals.

In 1986, after an additional demo produced by Hammett, which included his guitar tech John Marshall on 2nd guitar, Hammett brought the band to the attention of Mark Palmer at Music for Nations in England who signed Blind Illusion to a recording contract. By 1987, Gilson had left the band and Les Claypool re-joined for a third time while on a break from his band Primus. Before the recording of the album began, John Marshall left to join Metal Church and was replaced by ex-Possessed guitarist Larry LaLonde.

Recording of the album commenced at Hyde Street Studios with Kirk Hammett producing. At the same time in the adjacent Alpha and Omega Studios, Blue Öyster Cult were recording their Imaginos album. Blue Öyster Cult's manager, producer, and lyricist, Sandy Pearlman, heard Biedermann's playing and asked if he would like to guest on the album. Thus, Biedermann appeared on several songs on the album ("I Am The One You Wanted Me Of", "In the Presence of Another World" and "The Siege and Investiture of Baron Von Frankenstein's Castle at Weisseria") alongside notable guitarists such as Joe Satriani and The Doors's Robbie Krieger. In lieu of payment for his contributions to the album, Biedermann bartered for studio time to mix the Blind Illusion album, since they had spent all of their advance money by that point. The resulting debut album The Sane Asylum was released in the spring of 1988 on Combat Records in the US and Music For Nations affiliate label Under One Flag in Europe. While Hammett did in fact produce the album, he is not credited as such because of Metallica management requiring payment to use his name, which Biedermann declined. The band embarked on a US tour to promote the release with Hallows Eve and At War. Halfway through the tour, Claypool returned to Primus and was replaced by Adam Gates for the remainder of the tour. After the band returned home in 1989, LaLonde also left the band to join Claypool in Primus.

Blind Illusion then signed a recording contract with CBS Records and Biedermann brought in Vern McElroy on bass, Wes Anderson on drums, and Mark Strausburgh on guitar. The band began recording their second album titled The Medicine Show but the project was shelved, and Blind Illusion disbanded shortly after when their contract with CBS was declared null and void after Sony bought out CBS and dropped several acts from the label.

Mark Biedermann briefly played bass for Heathen on their Victims of Deception album in 1991.

Biedermann left the music business behind and taught Shaolin Kung-Fu at the Buddhist Monastery City of Ten Thousand Buddhas in Talmage, CA. It was at this time in 1999 that he discovered the name The Ghost Kings in a Buddhist sutra "The Past Lives of Earth Store Boddhissattva" which he used as the name for his Southern Rock project. Biedermann wrote upwards of 35 classic Southern rock / Country songs including King Hobo Dirt Road Okie and Ghost Kings with his musical partner, rhythm guitarist/vocalist "Scary" Eric Lagosh.

After a roughly 20-year hiatus, Biedermann reformed Blind Illusion in 2009 with a new lineup of Danny Harcourt on guitar and Robert Nystrom on drums, releasing their second studio album Demon Master on July 7, 2010. The album marked a very different style and sound from The Sane Asylum, going in a more traditional progressive/stoner rock direction. In September 2010, the group promoted the album at the Sobrante Stroll, a street fair held every year in El Sobrante since 1991. Before reuniting Blind Illusion, Biedermann had performed earlier shows at the Sobrante Stroll as well as at the older and much larger Solano Stroll fair in Berkeley. The material Biedermann covered included a mix of Blind Illusion originals and blues rock collaborations with other local musicians.

In December 2013, Biedermann met D.R.I. bassist Harald Oimoen in Berkeley, and Oimoen convinced Biedermann to return to the Sane Asylum sound that Blind Illusion were most associated with, and join with him and drummer Erik "Cire" Cruze from early East Bay Thrashers "Terminal Shock". These sessions were the catalyst for Biedermann to forge ahead in the classic Blind Illusion style. Biedermann eventually teamed up with former Heathen guitarist Doug Piercy and bassist Tom Gears to record the four track EP "2018". The band has played several European shows since.

In August 2020, Blind Illusion announced that they were in the studio recording their third album, entitled Wrath Of The Gods which included former Death Angel drummer Andy Galeon. The album was released on October 7, 2022.

Blind Illusion went on a European Tour in 2023, in support of the Wrath Of The Gods album, from September 1 to September 16.

On June 16, 2024, Blind Illusion announced a new lineup consisting of Mark Biedermann on lead guitar and vocals, Phil Cosentini on drums, Avery Thurman on bass and Martin Lacour on lead guitar.

On April 25, 2025, Blind Illusion got together with original vocalist David White to play a historical show supporting Death Angel and Exodus (celebrating 40 years of Bonded by Blood) at the UC Theatre in Berkeley, California. Songs that have not been played live in over 40 years were: Destroyer, Cry of the Banshee, Blind Sun and Walk the Iron. Also, Kamikaze and Smash the Crystal were played.

On October 25, 2025, Blind Illusion played Frost and Fire V Fest in Ventura, CA. They performed The Sane Asylum in its entirely for the first time in the band's history.

In early 2026 Blind Illusion signed with Hectic Records/Bleeding Priest records and announced a Live album titled STAGE FLIGHT: Live At The UC Theatre due for release on October 16, 2026. The limited edition vinyl features a special set of songs from 1978 to 1986 featuring original Blind Illusion vocalist David White (Heathen).

From April to May 2026 Blind Illusion entered the studio to record their fourth studio album, titled Crushing The Universe with Tom Gears (Nefarious, Ex-Blind Illusion) as producer.

Blind Illusion is currently mixing their fourth studio album, titled Crushing the Universe, which is due for release later in 2027.

On October 16th, 2026 Blind Illusion released their live album Stage Flight: Live at the UC Theatre on Hectic/Bleeding Priest Records and played their Record Release party in San Francisco at the Neck Of The Woods with Hemotoxin and Parabellum.

== Members ==
=== Current lineup ===
- Mark Biedermann – lead and rhythm guitars, lead vocals (1978–present)
- Martin Lacour – lead guitar (2024–present)
- Avery Thurman – bass (2024–present)
- Phil Cosentini – drums (2024–present)

=== Other former members (incomplete) ===
Vocals

- Keith Stewart (1978)
- David White (1979–1985, 2025–present)
- Dave (1992)

Guitars (incomplete)

- Bryan Kehoe (1981–1983)
- Evan McCaskey (1983)
- Hans Larson (1983)
- Pat Woods (1985–1986)
- Mark Searle (1985)
- John Marshall (1987)
- Larry LaLonde (1987–1989)
- Mark Strausberg (1989–1990)
- Eric Lagosh (1989)
- Steve Marcus (1992–1995)
- Eric Meyer (2007)
- Aaron Knudson (2015)
- Doug Piercy (2017–2024)

Bass (incomplete)

- Alvin Petty (1976–1977)
- Les Claypool (1978–1979, 1980–1981, 1986–1989)
- Chris Olsen (1979, 1980)
- Geno Gilson (1983–1986)
- Adam Gates (1988)
- Vern McElroy (1989–1990)
- Evan Barnes (1992–1995)
- Danny (2008–2014)
- Harald Oimoen (2013–2017)
- Tom Gears (2017–2024)

Drums (incomplete)

- Bret Hern (1979–1983) R.I.P.
- Bill Ticson (1983)
- Mike Miner (1983–1988)
- Wes Anderson (1988–1989)
- Albert Simmons (1992–1995)
- Steve Johnson (2008–2010)
- Robert Nystrom (2010–2014)
- Bret Hern (2014)
- Erik "Cire" Cruze (2014–2019)
- Brian Schwartz – drums (September 2019 – 2020)
- Liz Say – drums (selected live shows)
- Andy Galeon (2020–2024)

Keyboards

- Ben Heveroh (1982–1983)

== Discography ==
=== Studio and Live albums ===
- The Sane Asylum (1988)
  - The Sane Asylum (2007) (Metal Mind)
  - The Sane Asylum (2015) (World in Sound) (official remastered CD and limited issue gold vinyl – 12" and 7" set)
  - The Sane Asylum (2021) (re-release)
  - The Sane Asylum (2022) (Hammerheart Records) (+bonus live CD)
- Demon Master (2010)
- 2018 (2018) (4 tracks – "Race with the Wizard", "Ice Sage", "Metamorphosis of a Monster", "Vengeance Is Mine")
- Ultimate Anthology 1 (2021) (Cult Metal Classics - The entire 1979 Likewise Sessions and Demo)
- Wrath of the Gods (2022) (Hammerheart Records)
- Ultimate Anthology 2 (2023) (Cult Metal Classics - Complete Demos from 1980 - 1986 - 17 Songs)
- Stage Flight: Live At The UC Theatre (2026) (Hectic Records/Bleeding Priest Records)

=== Demos and known studio recordings ===
- 1979 Studio Demo ("The Watcher" / "Who Am I" / "Kamakazi" / "Death Is Grey" – four songs)
- 1979 Likewise Sessions ("Rockers Unite" / "Nightmare on Secret Town Rd" / "Death Noise" / "Freedom Passed Me By" / "Life Goes On" / "World's That's an Illusion" and the above aforementioned – ten songs)
- 1980 Demo ("On Death's Bed" / "Kamikaze")
- 1983 Demo ("Walk the Iron" / "Blind Sun")
- 1983 Demo ("Race the Wizard" / "Darkness" / "Death Noise" / "Concerto for a Dildo, Opus Oedipus, A lesson in Incest, A Bowel Movement in C Minor")
- 1984 Demo ("Trilogy of Terror: Banshee" / "Glass Guillotine" / "Destroyer")
- 1985 Demo ("Blood Shower" / "Smash the Crystal")
- 1986 Demo ("Slow Death" / "Vengeance Is Mine" / "Bloodshower" / "Kamikaze")
- 1988 Studio ("Medicine Show")
- 1988 Studio ("Espionage in Hell")
- 1989 Demo (Psychedelic Symphony)
- 1990 Studio ("Electric Soul" ~ six songs)
- 1992 Studio (four songs)
- 1993 Studio (five songs)
- 2014 Demo Tracks ("Iron Ox" / "Death Noise" / "Smash the Crystal" / "Naomi" / "Ice Sage")
- 2015–2017 Demo Tracks (numerous including reworked versions of "Espionage in Hell" and others, demo track recorded at Expressions).

Notes:

1979 recording

- Hard to find / limited circulation
- Produced by Mark Biedermann; includes two songs that are not listed on the Box
- "Healing" is not included on the demo tape; this is a compilation of "Medicine Show" and "Espionage in Hell"
- Demo and pre-production songs have been released on YouTube by the 2014 incarnation of the band
- "Death Noise" from the 1979 Demo Sessions was released on YouTube in February 2015
- "Medicine Show" from the unreleased album released on YouTube in February 2015
- The "L" Band. First Studio includes "Never Alive". Second includes "Psychedelic Survivors"
- Alternate versions exist with Jackie singing lead
