= Think This =

Studio album by Toxik
- Released: October 13, 1989
- Recorded: Morrisound Recording in Tampa, Florida (mixed at same location)
- Genre: Thrash metal; progressive metal
- Length: 53:32
- Label: Roadracer

Toxik chronology
| World Circus (1987) | Think This (1989) | Breaking Class (2017) |

Professional ratings
Review scores
| Source | Rating |
|---|---|
| AllMusic | 2.5/5 stars |
| Ultimate Guitar | 9.3/10 |
| Rock Hard | 9/10 |

Think This is the second studio album by the American thrash metal band Toxik, released on October 13, 1989 by Roadracer Records. It is their only studio album to feature vocalist Charles Sabin and guitarist John Donnelly, and the last one to feature bassist Brian Bonini and drummer Tad Leger. Think This would also be Toxik's last studio album before their initial breakup in 1992, resulting in a 33-year gap between records until the release of Dis Morta in 2022. The album was re-released by Metal Mind Productions and Displeased Records in 2007. Its artwork was designed by Ed Repka.

== Reception ==
In 2005, Think This was ranked number 409 in Rock Hard magazine's book The 500 Greatest Rock & Metal Albums of All Time.

== Track listing ==
All tracks are written by Josh Christian, except where noted.

| No. | Title | Writer(s) | Length |
|---|---|---|---|
| 1. | "Think This" | Josh Christian, Charles Sabin | 5:38 |
| 2. | "Greed" | Christian, Sabin | 4:10 |
| 3. | "Spontaneous" | | 5:09 |
| 4. | "There Stood the Fence" | | 4:44 |
| 5. | "Black and White" | | 5:10 |
| 6. | "Technical Arrogance" | Christian, Brian Bonini, Tad Leger | 5:25 |
| 7. | "ɯᴉᒋ uɹnᗺ / In God" | Johann Sebastian Bach, Bonini / Christian | 5:11 |
| 8. | "Machine Dream" | | 4:27 |
| 9. | "Out on the Tiles" (Led Zeppelin cover) | John Bonham, Jimmy Page, Robert Plant | 3:05 |
| 10. | "Shotgun Logic" | Christian, Sabin | 5:15 |
| 11. | "Time After Time" | Christian, Leger, Bonini, Sabin | 4:55 |
| 12. | "Think That" | | 0:27 |

Metal Mind reissue
| No. | Title | Length |
|---|---|---|
| 13. | "Shotgun Logic" (Demo) | 5:15 |
| 14. | "Black and White" (Demo) | 5:10 |

Displeased Records reissue
| No. | Title | Length |
|---|---|---|
| 13. | "Spontaneous (Live)" | 5:50 |
| 14. | "Shotgun Logic" | 5:07 |
| 15. | "Untitled Jam" | 3:24 |
| 16. | "Minor" | 5:57 |
| 17. | "Lost World" | 4:02 |

== Personnel ==
- Charles Sabin – vocals
- Josh Christian – guitars
- John Donnelly – guitars
- Brian Bonini – bass
- Tad Leger – drums
