= The Evolution of Chaos =

Studio album by Heathen
- Released: December 23, 2009 (Japan); January 25, 2010 (Europe); March 31, 2010 (United States); January 31, 2020 (10th Anniversary Edition)
- Recorded: 2008–2009
- Genre: Thrash metal
- Length: 68:29
- Label: Mascot Records, King Records
- Producer: Juan Urteaga and Heathen

Heathen chronology
Victims of Deception (1991)	The Evolution of Chaos (2009)	Empire of the Blind (2020)

The Evolution of Chaos is the third studio album by American thrash metal band Heathen. It is their first album in 18 years since 1991's Victims of Deception. It was released in Japan on December 23, 2009 via King Records, January 25, 2010 in Europe, and on March 31, 2010 in the US via Mascot Records. This album marked the band's first to feature guitarist Kragen Lum, the second and last to feature drummer Darren Minter, and would be the only one to feature Jon Torres on bass.

== Release ==
Heathen had recorded The Evolution of Chaos in 2008 and was originally scheduled for release on July 20, 2009, but was pushed back to late 2009 as more time was needed to complete the mixing process.

== Track listing ==
No.	Title	Lyrics	Music	Length
1.	"Intro" (instrumental)		Lee Altus	1:21
2.	"Dying Season"	David White	Altus	5:41
3.	"Control by Chaos"	White; Juan Urteaga	Kragen Lum	7:09
4.	"No Stone Unturned"	White	Altus	11:10
5.	"Arrows of Agony"	White	Altus	6:40
6.	"Fade Away"	White	Altus	5:43
7.	"A Hero's Welcome"	White	Altus	6:51
8.	"Undone"	Lum	Lum	6:42
9.	"Bloodkult"	White	Jon Torres	4:31
10.	"Red Tears of Disgrace"	White	Lum	5:51
11.	"Silent Nothingness"	White	Altus	6:50
Total length:				68:29

10th Anniversary Edition
No.	Title	Lyrics	Music	Length
1.	"Intro" (instrumental)		Lee Altus	1:21
2.	"Dying Season"	David White	Altus	5:41
3.	"Control by Chaos"	White; Juan Urteaga	Kragen Lum	7:09
4.	"No Stone Unturned"	White	Altus	11:10
5.	"Arrows of Agony"	White	Altus	6:40
6.	"Fade Away"	White	Altus	5:43
7.	"A Hero's Welcome"	White	Altus	6:51
8.	"Undone"	Lum	Lum	6:42
9.	"Bloodkult"	White	Jon Torres	4:31
10.	"Red Tears of Disgrace"	White	Altus	5:51
11.	"Seasons in Purgatory" (instrumental bonus track)		Torres	4:34
12.	"Silent Nothingness"	White	Altus	6:50
Total length:				73:03

10th Anniversary Edition bonus DVD
No.	Title	Length
1.	"The Making of The Evolution of Chaos Documentary"
2.	"Death by Hanging" (Live in Japan 2009)
3.	"Mercy Is No Virtue" (Live in Japan 2009)
4.	"Goblin's Blade" (Live in Japan 2009)
5.	"Opiate the Masses" (Live in Japan 2009)
6.	"Kill the King" (Live in Japan 2009)
7.	"Breaking the Silence" (Live in Japan 2009)
8.	"Dying Season" (Live in Japan 2009)
9.	"Open the Grave" (Live in Japan 2009)
10.	"Hypnotized" (Live in Japan 2009)
11.	"Dying Season" (Director's Cut)
12.	"Dying Season" (HD)

== Reception ==
Professional ratings
Review scores
Source	Rating
AllMusic	link
Jukebox Metal	link
Metal Rules	link
Ultimate Guitar	link

Reviews for the album have been very positive. Metal Rules gave the album a perfect five out of five, calling it an "absolute masterpiece of modern thrash" and "flawless in almost every way". The album has also netted an 8.7 out of 10 on Ultimate Guitar.

== Personnel ==
- David White – lead vocals
- Lee Altus – guitars
- Kragen Lum – guitars, backing vocals
- Jon Torres – bass, backing vocals
- Darren Minter – drums, backing vocals

Additional musicians

- Steve Di Giorgio – bass (fretless) on "No Stone Unturned", sitar on "Intro"
- Jon Allen – percussion and chimes on "Intro", backing vocals
- Gary Holt – guitars solo on "Control by Chaos"
- Adam Harrington – narration on "A Hero's Welcome", backing vocals
- Juan Urteaga – backing vocals
- Rob Dukes – backing vocals
- Dean Bardwell – backing vocals
- Tambre Bryant – backing vocals
- Terry Lauderdale – lead guitars on "Arrows of Agony" and "Silent Nothingness", backing vocals
- Alina "Squeak" Hernes – backing vocals

Production

- Travis Smith – artwork, layout, design
- Juan Urteaga – producer, recording
- Alina "Squeak" Hernes – photography
- Jacob Hansen – mixing, mastering
- Jeppe Anderson – engineering (assistant)

== Note ==
"A Hero's Welcome" features a voice-over from video game voice actor Adam Harrington, the brother of late guitarist Doug Harrington of Defiance, in which David White was also a member of from 1992 to 1995.
