= Breaking the Silence (album) =

Studio album by Heathen
- Released: May 1, 1987
- Recorded: 1986–1987
- Genres: Thrash metal, speed metal
- Label: Combat Records
- Producer: Ronnie Montrose

Heathen chronology
Pray for Death Demo (1986)	Breaking the Silence (1987)	Victims of Deception (1991)

Professional ratings
Review scores
Source	Rating
AllMusic	3.0/5 stars
The Metal Crypt	4.5/5 stars
Metal Storm	(9.1/10)

Breaking the Silence is the debut album by American thrash metal band Heathen, released in 1987 by Combat Records. As of 1987, the album sold about 100,000 copies worldwide.

== Track listing ==
Side A
No.	Title	Length
1.	"Death by Hanging"	5:04
2.	"Goblin's Blade"	4:34
3.	"Open the Grave"	7:22
4.	"Pray for Death"	3:42

Side B
No.	Title	Length
5.	"Set Me Free" (Sweet cover)	3:46
6.	"Breaking the Silence"	5:51
7.	"World's End"	7:05
8.	"Save the Skull"	5:22
Total length:		42:46

CD bonus track
No.	Title	Length
1.	"Heathen"	6:33
Total length:		49:19

Reissue bonus tracks
No.	Title	Length
1.	"Heathen"	6:35
2.	"Pray for Death" (from Pray for Death demo)	5:23
3.	"Goblin's Blade" (from Pray for Death demo)	4:30
4.	"Open the Grave" (from Pray for Death demo)	7:21
5.	"Heathen" (from Pray for Death demo)	6:57
Total length:		73:32

== Personnel ==
- Dave White – lead vocals
- Lee Altus – guitars
- Doug Piercy – guitars
- Mike Jazstremski – bass
- Carl Sacco – drums

=== Production ===
- Eddy Schreyer – mastering
- Mark Weinberg – art direction
- Kent Mathieu – cover art
- Ronnie Montrose – producer
- Roger Wiersma – engineering
- Dave Porter – recording
- Keith Hatschek – recording
- Joel Jaffe – recording (drums)
- Dan Godfrey – recording (drums)
- Alvin Petty – logo
