= Play God (album) =

1991 album by Reverend

Studio album LP by Reverend
- Released: 1991
- Genres: Thrash metal, speed metal
- Length: 39:31
- Label: Charisma
- Producer: Michael Rosen

Reverend chronology
World Won't Miss You (1990)	Play God (1991)	Live (1992)

Play God is an album by the American band Reverend, released in 1991. It was Reverend's second (and last) full-length release. Play God marked the departure of bassist Dennis O'Hara and drummer Rick Basha, who were replaced by Angelo Espino and Jason Ian, respectively. The album includes a cover of Creedence Clearwater Revival's "Fortunate Son".

== Critical reception ==
Professional ratings
Review scores
Source	Rating
AllMusic	4.5/5 stars
Chicago Tribune	1/4 stars
Rock Hard	10.0/10

The Chicago Tribune wrote that Wayne "screeches like a metal queen rather than the growly thrasher he wishes he were."

AllMusic wrote that, "under Rosen, Reverend sounded cleaner and more polished, but the heaviness and aggression remained."

== Track listing ==
All tracks are written by David Wayne and Brian Korban except where noted.

No.	Title	Length
1.	"Butcher of Baghdad"	3:56
2.	"Heaven on Earth"	3:56
3.	"Fortunate Son" (Creedence Clearwater Revival cover)	3:09
4.	"Blessings"	4:16
5.	"Promised Land"	3:02
6.	"Play God"	3:56
7.	"Warp the Mind"	3:18
8.	"What You're Looking For"	4:20
9.	"Blackened Thrive"	2:59
10.	"Death of Me"	4:20
11.	"Far Away"	2:19

== Personnel ==
- David Wayne: vocals
- Brian Korban: guitar
- Angelo Espino: bass
- Jason Ian: drums

Additional members

- Tommy Verdonck: guitar solo (track 1)
- Juan Garcia: backing vocals
