= Empire of the Blind =

Studio album by Heathen
- Released: September 18, 2020
- Recorded: 2019–2020
- Studio: Planet Z Studios
- Genre: Thrash metal
- Length: 47:16
- Label: Nuclear Blast
- Producer: Zeuss

Heathen chronology
The Evolution of Chaos (2009)	Empire of the Blind (2020)	Lifetime in Hell (2027)

Singles from Empire of the Blind
- 1. "The Blight" Released: June 26, 2020

Empire of the Blind is the fourth studio album by American thrash metal band Heathen, released on September 18, 2020. It is the band's first album in 11 years, following The Evolution of Chaos (2009), the first to feature bassist Jason Mirza, the only to feature drummer Jim DeMaria, and the last to feature guitarist and founding member Lee Altus. It is also their only album released on Nuclear Blast.

== Background ==
Although recording had not officially commenced until 2019, Heathen began working on the follow-up to The Evolution of Chaos in 2012 after they signed to Nuclear Blast. For the remaining seven years, the band was sidetracked by lineup changes, individual projects, and guitarist Kragen Lum filling in for Gary Holt in Exodus whenever Holt was touring with Slayer. In a September 2020 interview with KMUW radio, Lum recalled: "By about 2014 I had half the record completely demoed with vocals and everything. I continued to write over the next few years but I more or less too busy to demo it and properly finish the songs. I was touring with Exodus pretty heavily from about 2015 until 2019. Whenever we had a long enough break, I would work on stuff but it just really wasn't until last year where I had enough time to finish writing and I had more than enough for an album. There's a song that we actually didn't even record."

== Reception ==
Empire of the Blind was released to positive reviews from critics. Paul Hutchings of The Razor's Edge described the album as "top drawer with plenty of detail and thought applied", and stated, "The production of the album is slick and sharp, with engineering, production, mixing and mastering by Christopher 'Zeuss' Harris with additional work by Lum. Of course, without the music this is all irrelevant. Thankfully, Empire of the Blind meets all the expectations and more. Superbly performed, this is an album that should feature highly in the top albums of the year."

== Track listing ==
All tracks are written by Kragen Lum.

No.	Title	Length
1.	"This Rotting Sphere" (instrumental)	1:44
2.	"The Blight"	4:38
3.	"Empire of the Blind"	5:51
4.	"Dead and Gone"	3:56
5.	"Sun in My Hand"	4:54
6.	"Blood to Be Let"	3:36
7.	"In Black"	4:38
8.	"Shrine of Apathy"	4:58
9.	"Devour"	3:34
10.	"A Fine Red Mist" (instrumental)	5:15
11.	"The Gods Divide"	3:35
12.	"Monument to Ruin" (instrumental)	0:37
Total length:		47:16

== Personnel ==
=== Heathen ===
- David White – lead vocals
- Lee Altus – guitars
- Kragen Lum – guitars, backing vocals
- Jason Mirza – bass
- Jim DeMaria – drums

=== Additional musicians ===
- Gary Holt – guitar solo (track 10)
- Rick Hunolt – guitar solo (track 10)
- Doug Piercy – guitar solo (track 10)
- Zeuss – backing vocals

=== Production and design ===
- Zeuss – production, recording (drums, bass, vocals, additional guitars), engineering, mixing, mastering
- Kragen Lum – recording (guitars), art direction, layout
- Juan Urteaga – recording (Holt and Hunolt's solos)
- Doug Piercy – recording (Piercy's solo)
- Travis Smith – artwork
- Alvin Petty – logo
- Chrissie Dieu – photography

== Charts ==
Chart performance for Empire of the Blind
Chart (2020)	Peak position
German Albums (Offizielle Top 100)	23
Hungarian Albums (MAHASZ)	35
Scottish Albums (Official Charts)	90
