= Doug Piercy =

American guitarist

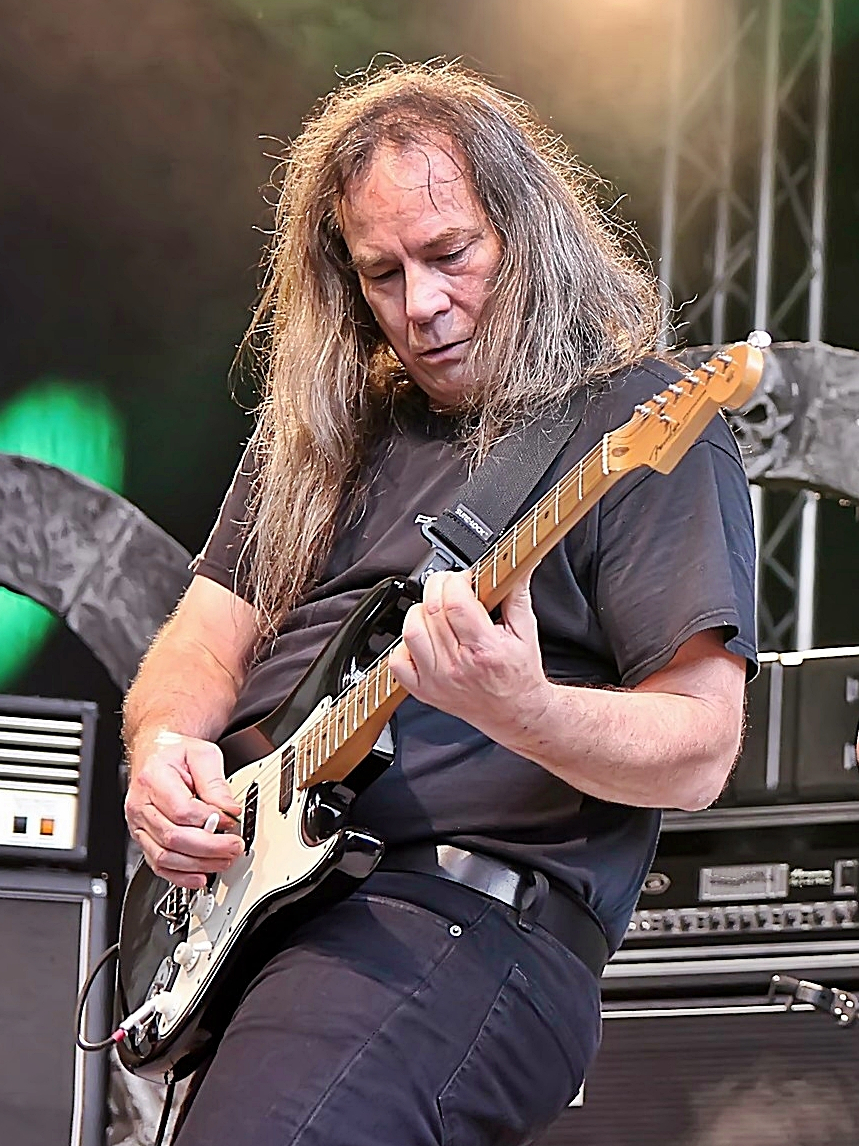
Piercy with Blind Illusion in 2018.

Doug Piercy is an American heavy metal guitarist. He played in the San Francisco heavy metal band Anvil Chorus in the early 1980s. Playing in Control briefly, he eventually moved on to his best-known project, Heathen, in 1985. Piercy shared lead and rhythm duties with Lee Altus in Heathen from 1985 to 1992, playing on both of their LPs Breaking the Silence and Victims of Deception. He left the band in 1991 after Roadrunner dropped Heathen prior to the Sepultura/European tour.

In 1994, Piercy then formed a new band in Germany, The Company, and released two records with them; the first titled simply "The Company" on Teichiku records who reached position 17 in the Japanese HM charts.

The second album, titled "Frozen by Heat", was released in Europe on Hi Gain records in Germany.

In 2006, he moved back to San Francisco. He has participated in various reunions with Heathen and Anvil Chorus, recording guitars on the Anvil Chorus Killing Sun record.

In 2010, he put together the Quintannica cover band.

He was also collaborating with Jon Torres at the time of his death.
