= David Wayne (singer) =

American heavy metal vocalist (1958–2005)

Background information
- Born: January 1, 1958; Renton, Washington, U.S.
- Died: May 9, 2005 (aged 47) Tacoma, Washington, U.S.
- Genres: Heavy metal; thrash metal; speed metal; power metal
- Occupations: Singer; musician; songwriter
- Instruments: Vocals; guitar
- Years active: 1982–2005
- Formerly of: Metal Church; Reverend; Wayne

David Wayne (born David Wayne Carnell, January 1, 1958 – May 9, 2005) was an American singer of the heavy metal bands Metal Church, Reverend and Wayne.

== Biography ==
David Wayne Carnell was born on January 1, 1958, in Renton, Washington to Vern and Billie Carnell. Wayne had 4 brothers, 1 sister, and 2 step-brothers. He began singing at church from a young age. By 8 years old, he was playing the guitar. Wayne's first band was with his brothers Darryl, Dennis, and Douglas. Wayne had one daughter, Tonya Lee, with his girlfriend, T'heila Anderson. After graduating from high school in 1976, he joined the US Army as a combat medic and was honorably discharged following a tour in Germany. Wayne would move to Seattle, Washington thereafter, and in 1983, he fronted Metal Church as lead vocalist. He would take vocal lessons from David "The Maestro" Kyle, who notably also taught future Metal Church singers Mike Howe and Ronny Munroe, respectively. During his first stint with the band, Wayne recorded the Four Hymns demo, Metal Church, and The Dark with the band. He was fired in late 1987 due to substance abuse, and creative differences with Kurdt Vanderhoof.

Following his departure from Metal Church, Wayne would relocate to L.A. Initially wanting to link up with Randy Piper's (formerly of W.A.S.P.) band, Animal, he would eventually join the ex-members of second Metal Church singer Mike Howe's old band, Heretic, to form the band Reverend after hearing their songs played on a tape recorder at a Denny's restaurant. Wayne described the ordeal as a "cosmic joke on all of us". Reverend would go on to release their 1989 Reverend EP, World Won't Miss You, Play God, and Live 1992 EP through various lineup changes with Wayne and Brian Korban being the only members to perform on all 4 releases. Once Reverend's recording contract with Charisma Records ended, Wayne would move back to Washington in 1993 and split ways with Korban. He would assemble a new incarnation of Reverend at the Little Dutch Inn in Yakima, Washington. This version of the band would record the previously unreleased album Soul Eater in 1993, which would later be officially released by VIC Records in 2026. Wayne would disband the Washington personnel Reverend in 1994 due to creative differences with the other band members.

In 1998, SPV/Steamhammer released a Metal Church live album simply titled Live using old live tapes from The Dark tour. This got the classic lineup of the band talking again, and eventually led to Masterpeace, which would be Wayne's final album with the group. Problems within the band would arise during Metal Church's 1999 European tour, and the band would go on hiatus in 2000.

Not wanting to wait around for Metal Church to reform, Wayne formed a new version of Reverend in Seattle. The band would release the 4-track EP A Gathering of Demons in 2001. Notably, the EP featured an altered rendition of Metal Church's Fake Healer with entirely different lyrics that Wayne wrote before his departure from the band in 1987. Wayne's version of the song was titled Legion. Metal Church was not pleased with him releasing the track despite Wayne crediting them on the EP.

In the summer of 2001, Wayne revealed that Metal Church had permitted him to carry on the band's name. However, he later learned that Vanderhoof had committed the Metal Church name to the record company for 2 more albums. He resolved the issue by calling the band Wayne, and the album Metal Church. Wayne's Metal Church (sometimes called David Wayne's Metal Church) was released on August 7, 2001. It would be the final album Wayne would release in his lifetime.

Wayne would tour with Reverend throughout 2001 and 2002. He started working on a new Reverend album titled Resurrection or Resurrected, but it was never finished. In 2003, Wayne planned to join Stuart Anstis (formerly of Cradle of Filth) in a band called BastardSun, but due to Wayne's problems with his passport and visa, it never happened. In June 2004, Wayne planned to relaunch Reverend for a two-day show with Flotsam and Jetsam and Exciter in San Antonio, TX. However, the show never happened due to a severe car accident Wayne was involved in.

In December 2004, while Wayne was still recovering from his leg injuries, he was contacted by Texas Metal Health for Reverend to appear at the Leukemia and Lymphoma Society benefit concert. He decided to bill the performance as David Wayne's Metal Church for publicity. Wayne played his final show on March 5, 2005, at Sam's Burger Joint in San Antonio, Texas. He was not feeling well during the show from his leg injuries and fell to the ground. He continued to sing even after falling.

== Death ==
Wayne died on May 9, 2005, from gangrene in his legs following the car crash. Beyond the Black: The Story of Metal Church states he was involved in a collision in April 2005, but was discharged from the emergency room due to a lack of insurance. Reverend drummer Todd Stotz claims Wayne suffered from diabetes and leg trouble before the accident. He was laid to rest at Evergreen Memorial Gardens Cemetery on May 13, 2005.

== Legacy ==
On May 29, 2005, Wayne's obituary, written by his daughter Tonya Lee, was published in the The News Tribune.

In 2006, Metal Church re-recorded "Watch The Children Pray" for their album A Light in the Dark in tribute to Wayne. The album's title is in homage to him, and a reference to The Dark album.

In 2014, DiveBomb Records reissued Reverend's World Won't Miss You with the 1989 Reverend EP included, and Play God with the Live 1992 EP added to the track list.

Wayne's band, Reverend, continues to play in his honor with the most recent lineup forming in 2019.

On March 5, 2020, HNE Records released Metal Church: The Elektra Years: 1984 - 1989, which featured the first 3 Metal Church albums, each in cardstock sleeves, with 3 bonus tracks.

On October 30, 2020, VIC Records reissued Reverend's A Gathering Of Demons with extensive liner notes, 8 new bonus tracks, including a remix of the EP, Reverend's cover of the UFO song, "Lights Out", and rare live and recording tracks.

In 2020, Byfist dedicated their album In The End in memory of Wayne.

In July 2025, Metal Church reissued Masterpeace as part of the Reforged: The Remastered Collection (1999-2013) box set.

In 2026, VIC Records reissued Reverend's 1989 EP, World Won't Miss You, and the previously unreleased 1993 Soul Eater album on CD and Vinyl.

== Discography ==
=== Metal Church ===
- Metal Church (1984)
- The Dark (1986)
- Live (1998)
- Masterpeace (1999)

=== Reverend ===
- Reverend (1989)
- World Won't Miss You (1990)
- Play God (1991)
- Live (1992)
- A Gathering of Demons (2001)
- Soul Eater (2026)

=== Wayne (David Wayne's Metal Church) ===
- Metal Church (2001)
