= List of Metallica concert tours =

List of concerts by American heavy metal band Metallica

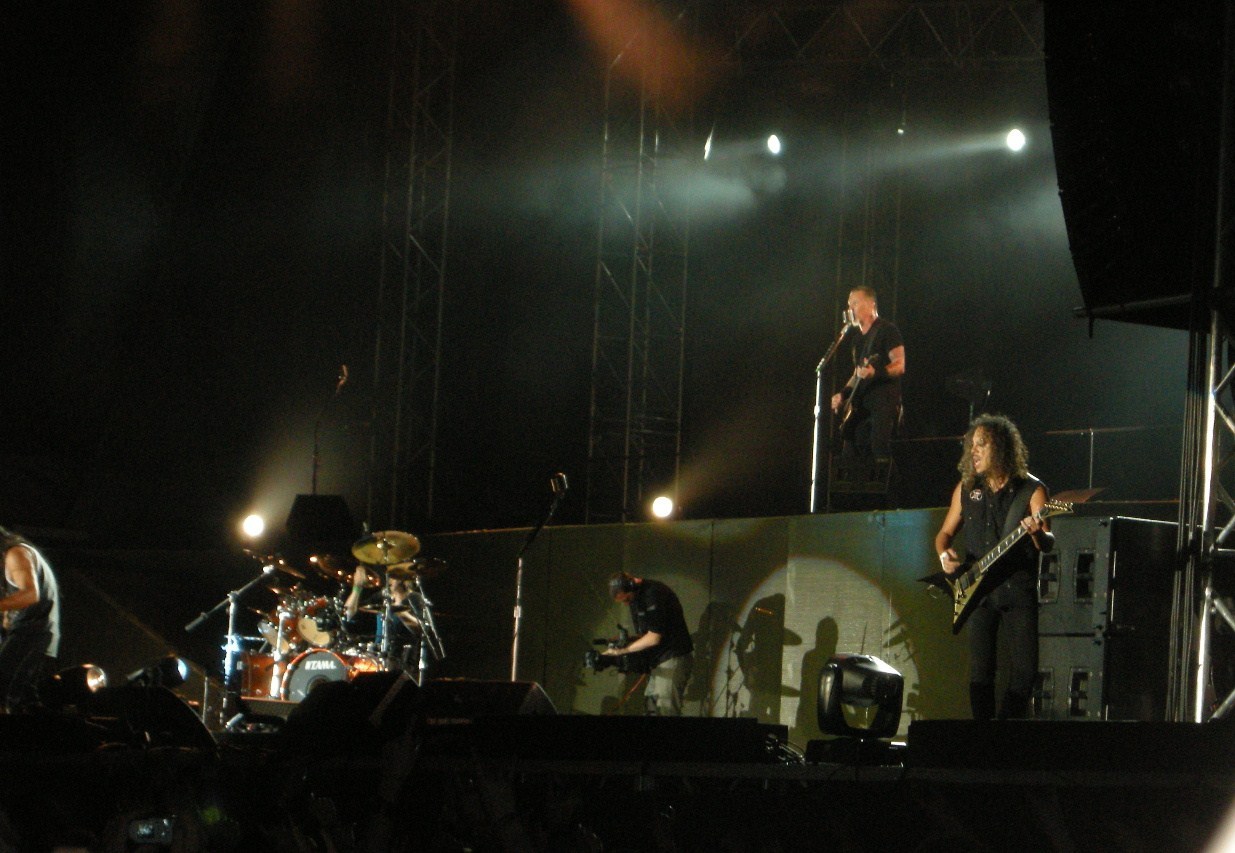
Metallica performing in Sweden for the World Magnetic Tour in 2009

Metallica is an American heavy metal band, founded in 1981 by drummer Lars Ulrich and rhythm guitarist James Hetfield. Aside from Ulrich and Hetfield, the original lineup for some of the 1982 concerts included Dave Mustaine (lead guitar and backing vocals) and Ron McGovney (bass guitar). Cliff Burton replaced McGovney in 1982 and played with the band until his death in 1986. After his death, bassists Jason Newsted (1986–2001), and Robert Trujillo (since 2003) were recruited in the band. The lead guitarist role was taken by Kirk Hammett (since 1983) after Dave Mustaine was fired from the band, who would then go on to form the band Megadeth. During the first years Metallica played in small festivals and as supporting acts on tours for bands such as Venom and Roxx Regime. Since their first live gig at Radio City, Anaheim on March 14, 1982, Metallica has performed on all seven continents numbering live events every year (with the exception of 2001) in a total of over 1,600 shows. The majority of these were played in the United States, but numerous concerts were also played in Canada, the United Kingdom, and Germany, among other countries. The band also went on nine worldwide tours: Damage, Inc. Tour (1986–1987), Damaged Justice (1988–1989), Wherever We May Roam Tour (1991–1992), Nowhere Else to Roam (1993), Madly in Anger with the World Tour (2003–2004), Escape from the Studio '06, World Magnetic Tour (2008–2010), WorldWired Tour (2016–2019), and M72 World Tour (2023–2027). During these tours, South Africa as well as several countries in Central and South America, Asia, and Oceania were visited.

Metallica has played many shows at major rock festivals such as Woodstock '94, Ozzfest, Monsters of Rock, Lollapalooza, Download Festival, Reading Festival, and Days on the Green. They also held numerous concerts in stadiums, some of which featured crowds of over 100,000 people. One of the highest-attendance music concerts in history was held by AC/DC on September 28, 1991, at Tushino Airfield in Moscow, where unofficially 1.6 million people attended. Some of these performances were later released as videos for special box set or DVD releases. Some performances have been held in theaters, including two April 1999 shows alongside the San Francisco Symphony that were released as the album S&M.

Metallica's first official tour was Kill 'Em All for One, which started in 1983 to promote their debut album. Their longest so far have been the Wherever We May Roam and World Magnetic Tours, which lasted 14 months and 20 months, respectively, with each having over 170 concerts. The band is among the most lucrative live bands, selling out half of their first 187 concerts held during the 2000s, and gaining an attendance of over 3.5 million people and a gross of over US$227 million.

== 1980s tours ==
Year(s)	Title	Legs (locations) and dates	Number of shows (Note: Complete list of shows for 1982, 1983, 1984, 1985, 1986, 1987, 1988, and 1989 are listed on the Metallica.com website. Retrieved January 1, 2011.)	Supporting acts (Note: Most of the supporting acts listed here joined Metallica only for a part of the whole tour.)
1983–1984	Kill 'Em All for One	US: July 27, 1983 – January 22, 1984	52	Raven, Anthrax, Exodus
This was the first tour played as a band, and it supported their first album, Kill 'Em All.
1984	Seven Dates of Hell	Europe: February 3–12, 1984	6	Venom (headliner),
Metallica played as supporting act for Venom, performing in front of 7,000 people at the Aardschok Festival in Zwolle, Netherlands.
1984	Bang That Head That Doesn't Bang	Europe: November 16 – December 20, 1984	25	Tank
The band had its first major European tour, with an average crowd of 1,300.
1985	Ride the Lightning Tour	North America: January 11 – March 19, 1985; Europe: August 13 – September 14, 1985; US: September 29, 1985 – December 31, 1985	57	WASP (co-headliner), Armored Saint, Tank, ZZ Top, Marillion, Bon Jovi, Ratt, Magnum, Tommy Vance, Exodus
The band went on tour to support their second album, Ride the Lightning, gaining an attendance of 60,000 at a show in Oakland, California, at the Day on the Green festival. During the tour, Metallica played for the first time at the Monsters of Rock festival. The concert was at Donington Park, England, in front of 70,000 people.
1986–1987	Damage, Inc. Tour	North America: March 27 – August 3, 1986; Europe: September 10–26, 1986; Japan: November 15–20, 1986; North America: November 26 – December 20, 1986; Europe: January 8 – February 13, 1987	142	Anthrax, Metal Church, Sword
The tour supported the band's third album Master of Puppets in which the headliner of the North American spring and summer portion was Ozzy Osbourne (The Ultimate Sin Tour). It was plagued with misfortune for the band, as the guitar technician John Marshall had to fill James Hetfield's place at the rhythm guitar twice due to wrist injury. Later, during the European portion, a bus accident in Sweden killed bassist Cliff Burton. The World Tour that followed introduced the new bassist, Jason Newsted.
1987	Monsters of Rock '87	Europe: August 20–30, 1987	4	Bon Jovi, Dio, Anthrax, WASP, Cinderella
The group went on the festival tour for the second time, with concerts in England and West Germany.
1988	Monsters of Rock '88	US: May 27 – July 30, 1988	32	Van Halen (headliner), Scorpions, Dokken, Kingdom Come
Metallica played in front of crowds numbering 40,000 to 53,000 people.
1988–1989	Damaged Justice	Europe: September 11 – November 5, 1988; North America: November 15, 1988 – April 21, 1989; Pacific Rim: May 1–27, 1989; North America: May 31 – September 23, 1989; South America: October 4–7, 1989	222	Danzig, Queensrÿche, Faith No More, Mortal Sin, The Cult
The tour supported the band's fourth album, ...And Justice for All. The August 29 and 30, 1989, shows in Seattle were later released in the box set Live Shit: Binge & Purge.

== 1990s tours ==
Year(s)	Title	Legs (locations) and dates	Number of shows (Note: Complete list of shows for 1990, 1991, 1992, 1993, 1994, 1995, 1996, 1997, 1998, and 1999 are listed on the Metallica.com website. Retrieved January 1, 2011.)	Supporting acts
1990	Tour 1990	Europe, North America: May 11 – June 30, 1990	12	Warrior Soul, Dio, Bonham, Aerosmith (headliner)
The tour consisted of several European festivals and stadium shows, as well as a private gig at The Marquee under the name The Frayed Ends. It included two shows in Aerosmith's Pump Tour, along with The Black Crowes and Warrant, with crowds of 60,000 and 30,000 spectators respectively.
1991	Monsters of Rock '91	Europe: August 10 – September 28, 1991	19	AC/DC (headliner), Pantera, Mötley Crüe, Queensrÿche, The Black Crowes
Metallica went on the festival tour a fourth time. The last concert of the tour, held on September 28 at Tushino Airfield in Moscow, was described as "the first free outdoor Western rock concert in Soviet history" and had a crowd estimated between 150,000 and 450,000 people, with some unofficial estimates as high as 1,600,000.
1991–1992	Wherever We May Roam Tour	North America: October 12, 1991 – July 5, 1992; Europe: October 22 – December 18, 1992	174	Metal Church - Opened: June 19 – July 5, 1992
The tour supported the fifth album, Metallica (also known as "The Black Album") which included a performance at the Freddie Mercury Tribute Concert, with the band performing a short set list and Hetfield performing with Queen and Tony Iommi. The January 13 and 14, 1992, shows in San Diego were later released in the box set Live Shit: Binge & Purge, while the tour and the album were later documented in A Year and a Half in the Life of Metallica.
1992	Guns N' Roses/Metallica Stadium Tour	North America: July 17 – October 6, 1992	25	Guns N' Roses (co-headliner), Faith No More, Motörhead
It was an overlap of Metallica's Wherever We May Roam Tour and Guns N' Roses' Use Your Illusion Tour. James Hetfield suffered serious burns during a show in Montreal; John Marshall filled the guitar for the rest of the tour.
1993	Nowhere Else to Roam	North America: January 22 – March 13, 1993; World Tour: March 16 – May 8, 1993; Europe: May 19 – July 4, 1993	77	Suicidal Tendencies, Megadeth, The Cult, Alice in Chains, Kyuss
The shows in Mexico City across February and March 1993 were later released as part of the box set Live Shit: Binge & Purge. It is also the first time the band met Robert Trujillo who would join the band almost a decade later.
1994	Shit Hits the Sheds Tour	US: May 28 – August 21, 1994	51	Danzig, Suicidal Tendencies, Candlebox, Fight
The tour included a performance at Woodstock '94 on August 13 in front of a crowd of 350,000.
1995	Escape from the Studio '95	UK, Canada, US: August 23 – December 14, 1995	5	Slayer, Skid Row, Slash's Snakepit, Therapy?, Warrior Soul, Machine Head, White Zombie, Corrosion of Conformity
During the tour, a song from each of the next two albums were played ("2 × 4" and "Devil's Dance"). At the Donington Park concert, Metallica joined the Monsters of Rock for a fifth time. It was the first tour with most of songs in Eb Tuning still used today
1996	Lollapalooza No. 6	North America: June 4 – August 4, 1996	28	Soundgarden, Cocteau Twins, Devo, Ramones, Rancid, Screaming Trees, Psychotica
Metallica headlined the festival tour, in front of crowds of about 20,000, with many shows being sold out.
1996–1997	Poor Touring Me	Europe: September 6 – November 27, 1996; North America: December 19, 1996 – May 28, 1997	139	Corrosion of Conformity, Soundgarden, Korn
The tour supported the recently released album Load. The May 9 and 10, 1997, shows in Fort Worth, Texas, were later released in the video Cunning Stunts.
1997	Blitzkrieg '97	Europe: August 22–24, 1997	3	
Metallica plays at European festivals to fulfill earlier contractual obligations. They play three back-to-back shows at the Pukkelpop Festival in Belgium, Blind Man's Ball in Germany, and Reading Festival in England.
1997	Re-Load Promo Tour	US, Europe: November 11–18, 1997	6	
The tour promoted the just-released album ReLoad. 50,000 fans attended a free concert held in Philadelphia in November, later named Million Decibel March.
1998–1999	Poor Re-Touring Me Tour	Pacific Rim: March 21 – May 8, 1998; North America: June 24, 1998 – April 30, 1999	65	Jerry Cantrell, Days of the New
The shows on April 21 and 22, 1999, at Berkeley Community Theatre, alongside the San Francisco Symphony, were released as the album S&M.
1998	Garage Inc Promo Tour	North America: November 17–24, 1998	5	
The tour supported the album Garage Inc. which saw the band perform only cover songs, while the opening acts were Metallica cover bands.
1999	Garage Remains the Same Tour	Mexico, South America: April 30 – May 14, 1999; Europe, US: May 21 – December 8, 1999	53	Monster Magnet
The tour supported the album Garage Inc. During the tour, Metallica played two live concerts similar to the one released in S&M; one in Germany with Babelsberger Filmorchester on November 19; and one at the Madison Square Garden, New York City, with the Orchestra of St. Luke's on November 23.
1999–2000	M2K Mini Tour	US: December 28, 1999 – January 10, 2000	10	Ted Nugent, Sevendust, Kid Rock, Black Sabbath, Creed
The New Year's Eve show in Pontiac, Michigan, was in front of 50,000 people.

== 2000s tours ==
Year(s)	Title	Legs (locations) and dates	Number of shows (Note: Complete list of shows for 2000, 2002, 2003, 2004, 2005, 2006, 2007, 2008, 2009, and 2010 are listed on the Metallica.com website. Retrieved August 15, 2024.)	Supporting acts
2000	Summer Sanitarium Tour	US: June 23 – August 9, 2000	21	Korn, Kid Rock, Powerman 5000, System of a Down
Hetfield missed three shows due to a back injury. Newsted sang most of the songs during these concerts, and the vocals and rhythm guitar were also taken by musicians from the other bands.
2003	Summer Sanitarium 2003 Tour	Europe: June 4–28, 2003; Europe, North America: July 4 – August 29, 2003	36	Limp Bizkit, Deftones, Mudvayne, Linkin Park, Lostprophets, The Darkness
As a tour supporting album St. Anger, it marked the first time the new bassist, Robert Trujillo, played live with the band.
2003–2004	Madly in Anger with the World Tour	World Tour: November 6, 2003 – November 28, 2004	137	Godsmack, Lostprophets, Slipknot, In Flames
Another tour supporting album St. Anger, in which most shows were made available later for purchase as a digital download. Before the show in Download Festival, Lars Ulrich was rushed to the hospital after having an anxiety seizure and was unable to perform, and Metallica played in that gig with guest drummers Dave Lombardo and Joey Jordison, and Ulrich's drum technician Flemming Larsen.
2006	Escape from the Studio '06	World Tour: March 13 – August 15, 2006	16	Avenged Sevenfold, Bullet for My Valentine, Trivium, Tool
Two untitled new songs were played, and some portions ended up being featured on the next released album. Tour also featured the album Master of Puppets played in its entirety in its proper sequence for the first time.
2007	Sick of the Studio '07	Europe: June 28 – July 18, 2007	14	Mastodon, Him, Joe Satriani, Stone Sour, Incubus, Faithless, Interpol, The Kooks, My Dying Bride, Heaven and Hell, Oomph!, Machine Head, Turbonegro, Volbeat, Mnemic, Diablo
The tour featured shows at festivals and in stadiums, with crowds numbering 60,000 people.
2008	2008 European Vacation Tour	North America, Europe: May 14 – August 24, 2008	26	The Sword, Ozzy Osbourne, Serj Tankian, Hellyeah, Jonathan Davis, Cavalera Conspiracy, Shadows Fall, Apocalyptica, In This Moment
Two songs from the upcoming album were debuted. The band played at Ozzfest for the first time in their history, being featured as headliners and playing right after Ozzy Osbourne.
2008–2010	World Magnetic Tour	Europe, Israel: September 12, 2008 – June 27, 2010; US, Canada: October 17, 2008 – December 12, 2009; Latin America: June 4, 2009 – March 14, 2010; Australia, Japan, New Zealand: September 15, 2010 – November 21, 2010	187	Lamb of God, The Sword, Volbeat, Machine Head, Down, Mastodon, Baroness, Avenged Sevenfold, Resorte, Mass Hysteria, Alice in Chains, Glyder, Fear Factory, Gojira, Horcas, Mad, Hibria, Sepultura, High on Fire, Orphaned Land, Criminal
Tour supporting the album Death Magnetic. The tour was the 16th highest-grossing concert tour ever. The shows on June 4, 6 and 7 at Mexico City, on July 7, 2009, at Nîmes, France and on October 31 and November 1 at Quebec City were released on the DVDs Orgullo, Pasión y Gloria: Tres Noches en la Ciudad de México, Français Pour Une Nuit and Quebec Magnetic respectively. The tour ended with concerts in Australia and in New Zealand in November 2010.

== 2010s tours ==
Year(s)	Title	Legs (locations) and dates	Number of shows (Note: Complete list of shows for 2011, 2012, 2013, 2014, and 2015, 2016, 2017, 2018, and 2019 are listed on the Metallica.com website. Retrieved August 15, 2024.)	Supporting acts
2011	2011 Vacation Tour	North America, Europe, South America, Asia: April 23 – October 30, 2011	17	Slayer, Megadeth, Anthrax, Biffy Clyro
Tour features the first two Big Four U.S. shows in Indio, California, and New York City, respectively, as well as the band's first ever show in India.
2012	2012 European Black Album Tour	Europe: May 7 – June 10, 2012	16	Gojira, Machine Head, The Kills, Soundgarden, Channel Zero, Mastodon, Ghost
Tour headlining European festivals, such as Sonisphere Festival, Download Festival, Nova Rock Festival, Rock in Rio Lisboa, Werchter Boutique, Rock am Ring and Rock im Park. As a late celebration for The Black Album's 20th anniversary, it was played in its entirety in reverse.
2012	The Full Arsenal Tour	North America: July 28 – August 29, 2012	13	Jim Breuer
Few of the shows were recorded for the band's movie Metallica: Through the Never, was the first tour that the band had two songs for the encore rather than three, and included stage antics like the stage falling apart, the Death Magnetic Coffins, and much more.
2013	Summer Tour 2013	North America, Asia, Europe, South America, Antarctica: June 8 – September 21, 2013	14	Anvil
At the second Orion Music + More festival held in Detroit, the band played under the fake-name "Dehaan" - "Dehaan" being a reference to actor Dane DeHaan, who starred in Metallica: Through the Never - and played Kill 'Em All in its entirety, celebrating the 30th anniversary of the release. Following the tour, Metallica played a show called "Freeze 'Em All" in Antarctica's Carlini Base, becoming the first band to play on all seven continents.
2014	By Request Tour	Europe, South America and Montreal in North America: March 16, 2014 – August 9, 2014	26	De La Tierra, Raven, Slayer, Mastodon, Ghost, Gojira, Avenged Sevenfold, Alter Bridge, In Extremo, Biffy Clyro, Rob Zombie, Jack White, Robert Plant, Alice in Chains, Volbeat, Placebo, Skrillex, Airbourne, Children of Bodom, Kvelertak, Anthrax, Dropkick Murphys, Apocalyptica
An interactive tour, concertgoers could vote, via internet, which songs Metallica would include on each night's setlist and, at the concert, via SMS, to a song in the encore. Metallica debuted a new song, called "Lords of Summer". Metallica's only stop in North America was in Montreal for the Heavy Montreal festival.
2015	Lords of Summer Tour	North America, South America and Europe: May 9, 2015 – September 19, 2015	16	Linkin Park, Faith No More, Tame Impala, Meshuggah, Bring Me the Horizon, Gojira, Baroness, Mötley Crüe
Back-to-back gigs in Quebec City marked both the last concert held at Colisée Pepsi and the first musical performance held at Centre Videotron.
2016–2019	WorldWired Tour	North America, South America, Europe, Asia, Oceania : September 27, 2016 – August 25, 2019	159	Cage the Elephant, Babymetal, Lang Lang, Hatesphere, Iggy Pop, Avenged Sevenfold, Volbeat, Gojira, Kvelertak, Jim Breuer, Ghost, Bokassa, Slipknot Santaferia
A concert tour in support of their tenth studio album, Hardwired... to Self-Destruct.

== 2020s tours ==
Year(s)	Title	Legs (locations) and dates	Number of shows (Note: Complete list of shows for 2021, 2022, 2023, 2024, 2025 and 2026 are listed on the Metallica.com website.)	Supporting acts
2021–2022	2021–2022 tours	North America, South America, Europe: September 16, 2021 – December 16, 2022	38	DJ Lord, Greta Van Fleet, Ice Nine Kills, Mudvayne, Raven, Social Distortion, Trivium
A concert tour in support of the 30th anniversary of their self-titled fifth studio album and the 40th anniversary of the band. It was also their first tour after the COVID-19 pandemic.
2023–2027	M72 World Tour	Asia, Europe, North America, Oceania: April 27, 2023 – June 19, 2027	111	Architects, Mammoth WVH, Five Finger Death Punch, Volbeat, Ice Nine Kills, Pantera, Greta Van Fleet, Floor Jansen, Epica, Suicidal Tendencies, Limp Bizkit, Evanescence, Avatar, Gojira, Knocked Loose
A concert tour in support of the band's eleventh studio album, 72 Seasons.

== First and other performance ==
Year(s)	Locations and dates	Number of shows	Supporting acts
1982–1983	US: March 14, 1982 – May 7, 1983	36	
First gig was at Radio City, Anaheim on March 14, 1982, other gigs during 1982 and early 1983 as a band were not played as a tour, as the new band released several demos and went through a couple of line-up changes, as Ron McGovney was replaced by Cliff Burton as bassist and several months later Dave Mustaine lead guitarist and backing vocalist was replaced by Kirk Hammett.
2000–2003	California/England: November 30, 2000 – June 1, 2003	10	
Without a bass player, the band played few shows as they auditioned for a bassist. The year 2001 was the first since the band's formation when Metallica played no shows at all. During their only performance of 2002, the band introduced themselves as Bob's Band (after Bob Rock who helped on bass).
2005	Rolling Stones Gigs 2005	2	The Rolling Stones (headliner), Everclear
The band interrupted its vacation after being invited to open two shows for The Rolling Stones' A Bigger Bang Tour in San Francisco, California.
2025	Back to the Beginning	1	Ozzy Osbourne and Black Sabbath (headliner)
Farewell concert for Ozzy Osbourne and Black Sabbath.
