= Freeze 'Em All =

2013 Antarctica concert by Metallica

- One-off concert by Metallica
- Location: Carlini Base, Antarctica
- Date: December 8, 2013
- No. of shows: 1
- Attendance: ~120

Metallica concert chronology
- Summer Tour (2013); Freeze 'Em All (2013); By Request Tour (2014)

Freeze 'Em All was a one-off concert by American heavy metal band Metallica played in Antarctica on December 8, 2013. It took place in a dome near the heliport of the Carlini Base in King George Island, and was attended by 120 people, including members of nearby base's research teams and winners of a sweepstakes offered by the Coca-Cola Company.

The concert featured ten songs played over the span of an hour. To prevent noise pollution, the show was played without any traditional amplification and was instead transmitted to the audience through headphones. The concert made Metallica the first band to perform on all seven continents. The concert was later released as a live album, and a documentary centered around the production of the concert and the band's time in Antarctica was released in 2015.

== Background and production ==
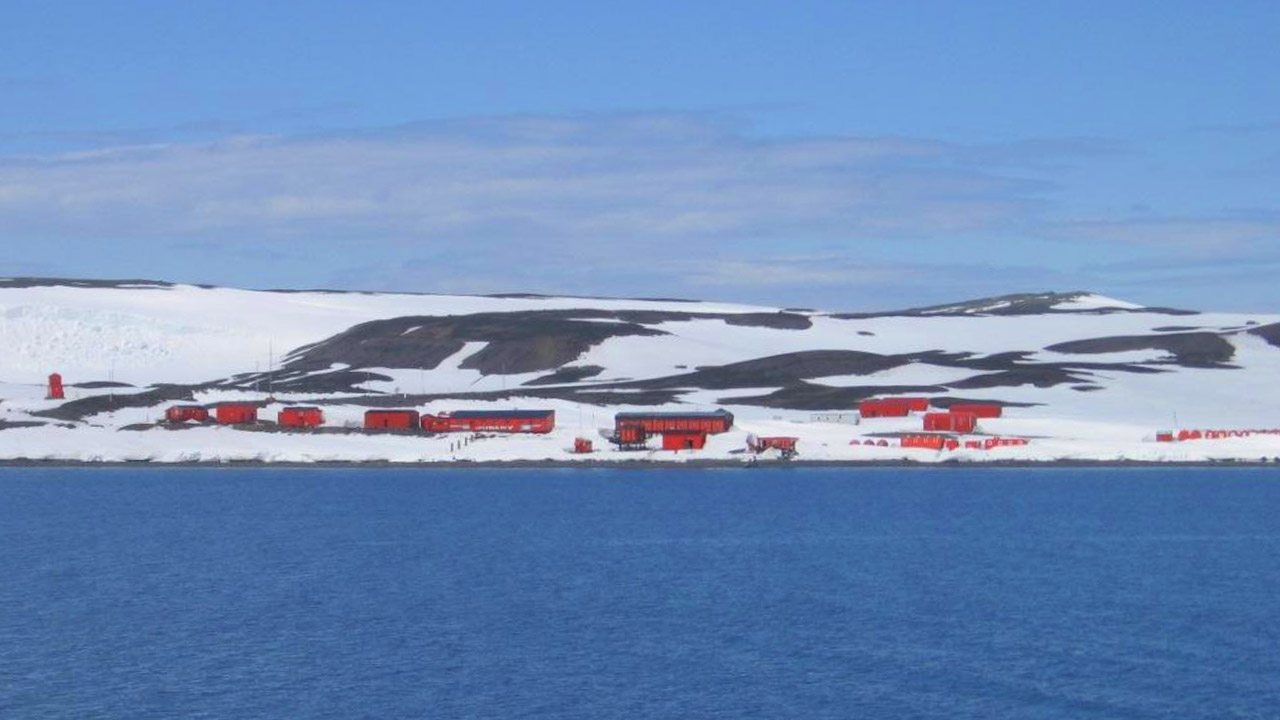
A photo of the Carlini Base in 2018

Freeze 'Em All was first hinted at by Metallica's drummer Lars Ulrich in September 2013, when he stated that "there [was] a very interesting thing coming our way" in December of that year, and that there was "another frontier coming." The concert was officially announced on October 25, 2013, with the band stating that they had "been unbelievably fortunate to visit just about every corner of the Earth... except for one." The concert was done in collaboration with the Coca-Cola Company, which offered a sweepstake in five Latin American countries–specifically Argentina, Chile, Colombia, Costa Rica and Mexico–where ten winners would receive an eight-day cruise from Tierra del Fuego to Antarctica to watch the concert. The name Freeze 'Em All was a play on the name of the band's debut album, Kill 'Em All (1983).

Freeze 'Em All took place at the Carlini Base, an Argentine-operated base in Antarctica on December 8, 2013. The concert was about one hour long, with the band performing ten songs inside of a small dome near the base's heliport. Examples of songs performed included "Enter Sandman" and "Master of Puppets". In a 2014 Reddit AMA, Ulrich stated that the band also planned to play "Trapped Under Ice" during the show, but forgot due to all of the "momentary excitement". It marked the first time a band had performed in Antarctica, excluding the short-lived Nunatak, an indie rock band created by researchers in 2007. In accordance with the Madrid Protocol, the show was played without any traditional amplification, and was instead transmitted to the audience through headphones. This was done to try and preserve the local environment from noise pollution, as it was believed the loud noise would cause chunks of ice to break away and melt. An estimated 120 people attended the concert, consisting only of researchers and contest winners.

On December 20, 2013, Metallica released the recordings from the concert as a live album on their website, with two additional tracks titled "Bass Solo" and "Kirk Solo". It was later accompanied by the release of the concert's video footage onto the band's YouTube channel. In 2015, a documentary about the production of the concert and the band's experience of being in Antarctica was released, with it initially being made available for free to all members of the band's official fan club. Metallica considered the show to be a success, stating that it was the "most unique show" they had ever done "words [could] not describe how happy everyone was". With Freeze 'Em All, Metallica set a Guinness World Record as the first band to perform on all seven continents, as well as the first one to perform on all continents within the span of only a year.

== Set list ==
The following lists the songs performed during Freeze 'Em All.

1. "Creeping Death"
2. "For Whom The Bell Tolls"
3. "Sad but True"
4. "Welcome Home (Sanitarium)"
5. "Master Of Puppets"
6. "One"
7. "Blackened"
8. "Nothing Else Matters"
9. "Enter Sandman"
10. "Seek & Destroy"

== See also ==
- List of Metallica concert tours
- Metallica discography
- Live Earth concert, Antarctica
