= Estadio Único Diego Armando Maradona =

Football stadium in La Plata, Argentina

Coordinates: 34°54′49.5″S 57°59′20.5″W

Unique Diego Armando Maradona Stadium
- Estadio Único Diego Armando Maradona
- Estadio Único

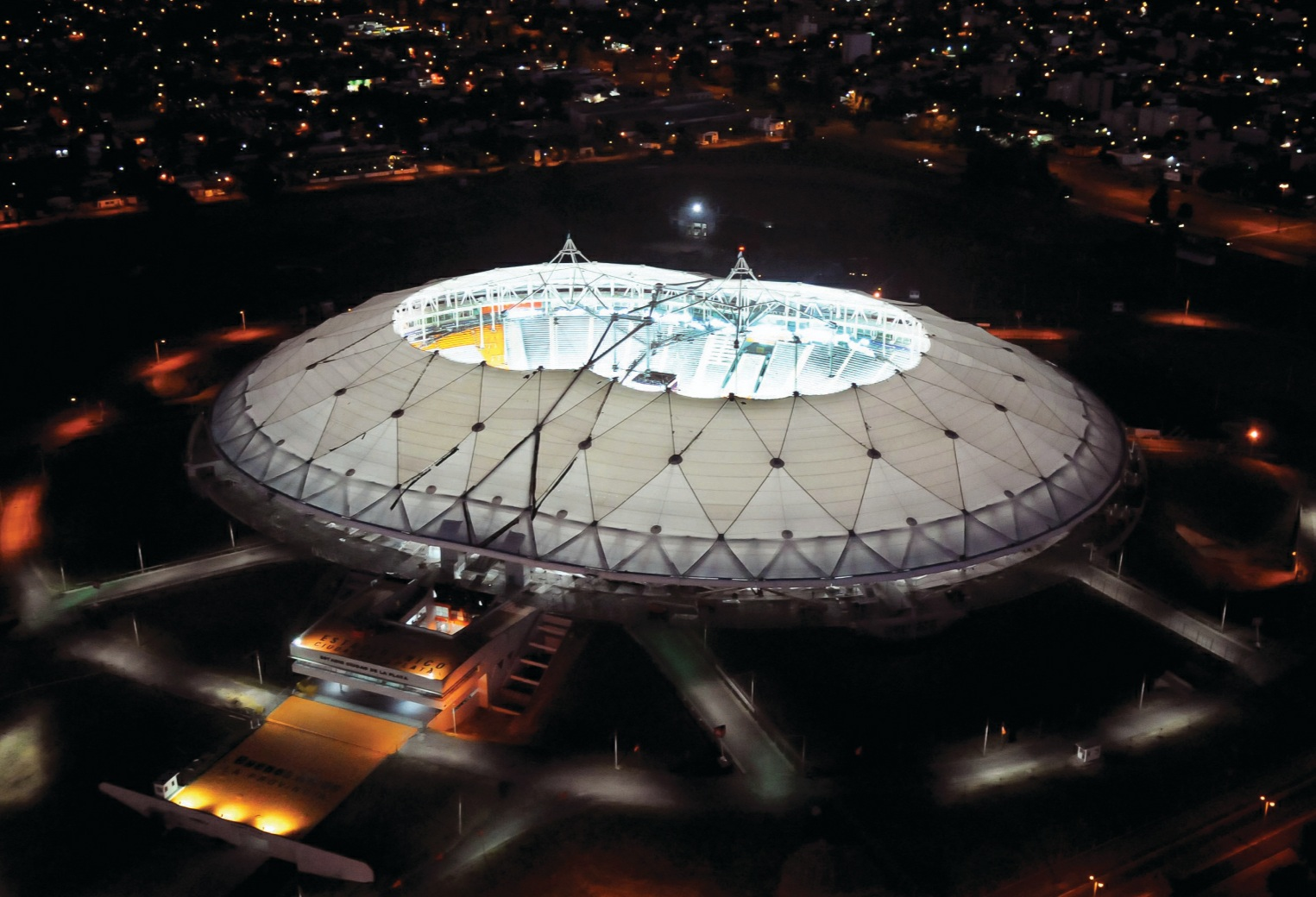
- Aerial view of the stadium at night in 2014
- Interactive map of Unique Diego Armando Maradona Stadium
- Full name: Estadio Único Diego Armando Maradona
- Former names: Estadio Ciudad de La Plata
- Address: La Plata; Argentina
- Owner: Buenos Aires Province
- Operator: AFA (2025–pres.)
- Capacity: 53,000
- Surface: PlayMaster hybrid grass
- Field size: 105 x 70
- Current use: Football matches; Rugby matches; Concerts

Construction
- Built: 1997–2003
- Opened: June 7, 2003
- Renovated: 2011, 2026
- Cost: AR$100 million
- Architect: Roberto Ferreira

Tenants
- Estudiantes LP (2003–present); Gimnasia y Esgrima LP (2003–present); Argentina national football team (2003–present); Argentina national rugby team (2003–present)

Website
- estadiolp.gba.gob.ar

The Estadio Único Diego Armando Maradona (English: Unique Diego Armando Maradona Stadium, formerly Estadio Ciudad de La Plata) is a multi-purpose stadium located in La Plata, Argentina. It is also known popularly as the Estadio Único (Single Stadium) and is owned by Buenos Aires Province, administered by the Argentine Football Association since December 2025. It had been previously managed jointly by the provincial government, the Municipality of La Plata, and local clubs Estudiantes and Gimnasia y Esgrima.

Opened on June 7, 2003, the stadium was considered "the most modern of Latin America", even without having completed all of the planned construction. Its tenants include Estudiantes LP whose own stadium, the Estadio Jorge Luis Hirschi, was declared unsafe in 2005, and Gimnasia y Esgrima LP. Gimnasia returned to their original stadium (Estadio Juan Carmelo Zerillo) in mid-2008.

It is located between 32nd and 526th avenues, 25 Street and 21. These fields also contain a small rugby union stadium and a center for Physical Education, which tend to be intercollegiate events with schools in the area, such as the school No. 31, better known as the Saint Martin Commercial.

== History ==
=== Beginnings ===
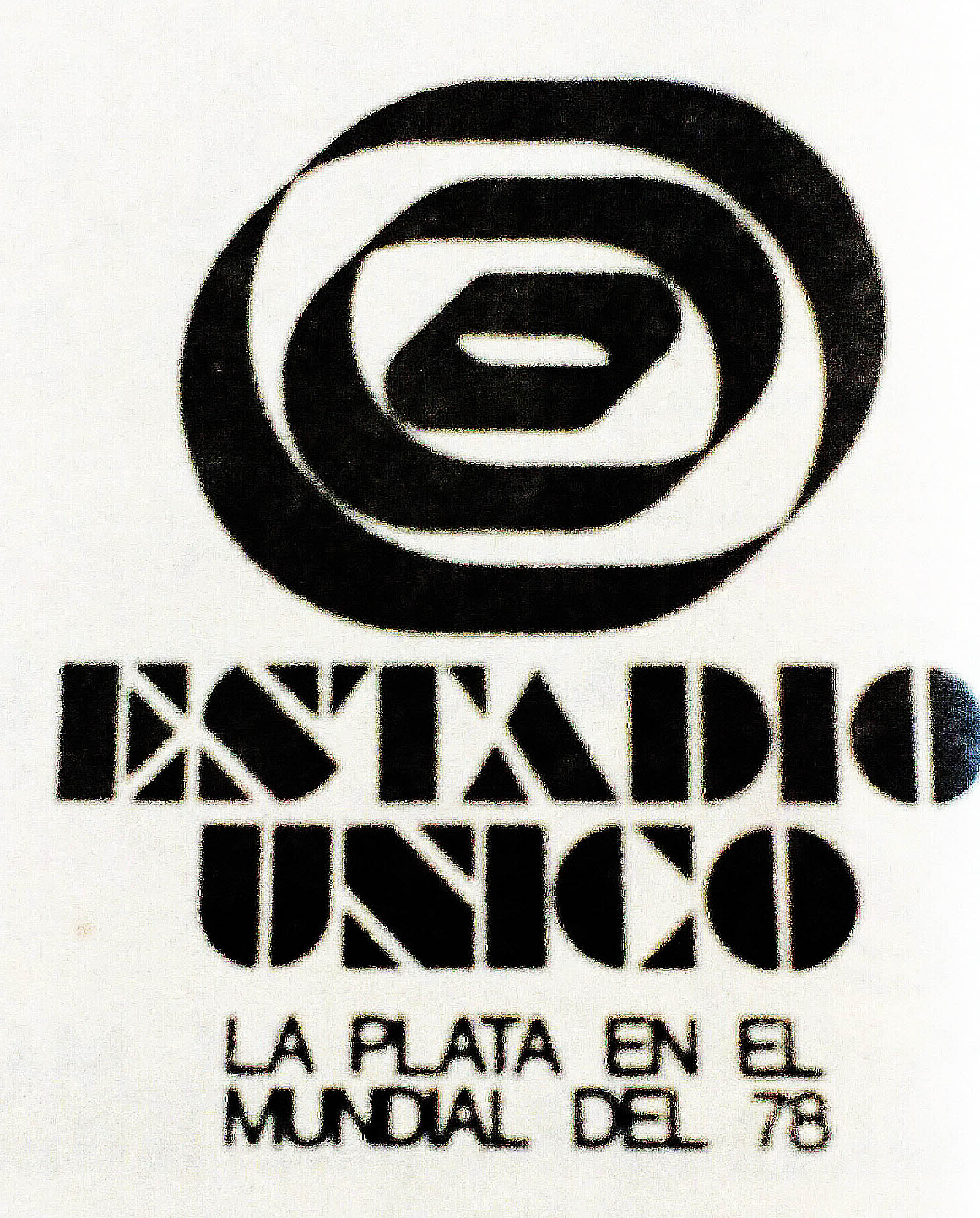
Poster displaying a logo for the project of a stadium in La Plata which would be a venue for the 1978 World Cup. It was finally dismissed

The idea of the project began in 1947 when Governor Domingo Mercante expropriated the property located at the junction of Roads 32 and 25 and formed the La Plata Sports Complex.

In 1972, La Plata was to be a candidate to host matches in the 1978 FIFA World Cup. The Government of Argentina called for project competitive bids to construct a "unique stadium" in the city. It would be built in a municipal land situated near Ringuelet train station, adding other lands to be expropriated. The government choose the project presented by Antonini-Schon-Zemborain, nevertheless it would never carried out.

In 1989, after a meeting between the Buenos Aires Province Government and the Municipality of La Plata's, Estudiantes and Gimnasia, created a committee to build and manage a complex dedicated entirely to the practice of football and other sports.

Thus, after reviewing several alternatives, the construction of the stadium was proposed to take place in the area of the Center for Physical Education No. 2. This determined as the most accessible area for a stadium in La Plata. In January 1992 it was signed into law 11118, which established the construction site.

=== Construction ===
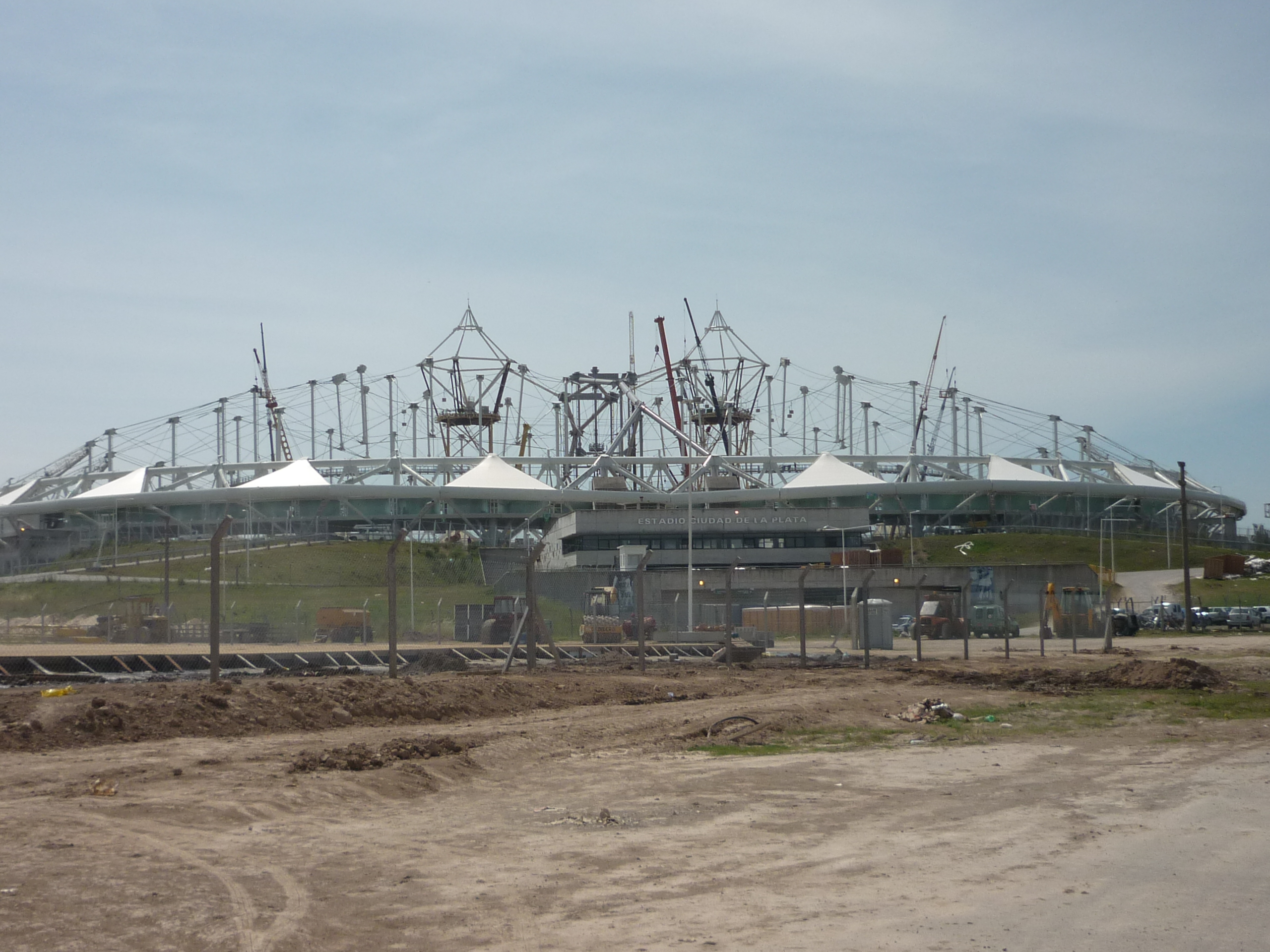
Structure of the stadium roof as seen in 2010

On April 21, 1992, the Estadio Ciudad de La Plata Foundation was established, which was an institution composed equally of representatives from Estudiantes and Gimnasia. The College of Architects and Engineers held a meeting in April 1993 to choose an architectural proposal. It was awarded to Roberto Ferreira & Associates.

In 1996 a permit was given by the Executive Branch that awarded the provincial administration the right to begin construction the following year. The Executive Unit called for public tenders for the job.

A year later they began building the supports for the roof. And in 1998, the governor Eduardo Duhalde and the Mayor of La Plata, Julio Alak, laid the first stone to begin the construction of the stadium.

The works also detained foir trade union and economic problems in 2000, so ad with Eduardo Duhalde as President of the Nation, called for a new tender for the allocation of investment with a view to its installation in May 2003.

=== Opening and events ===
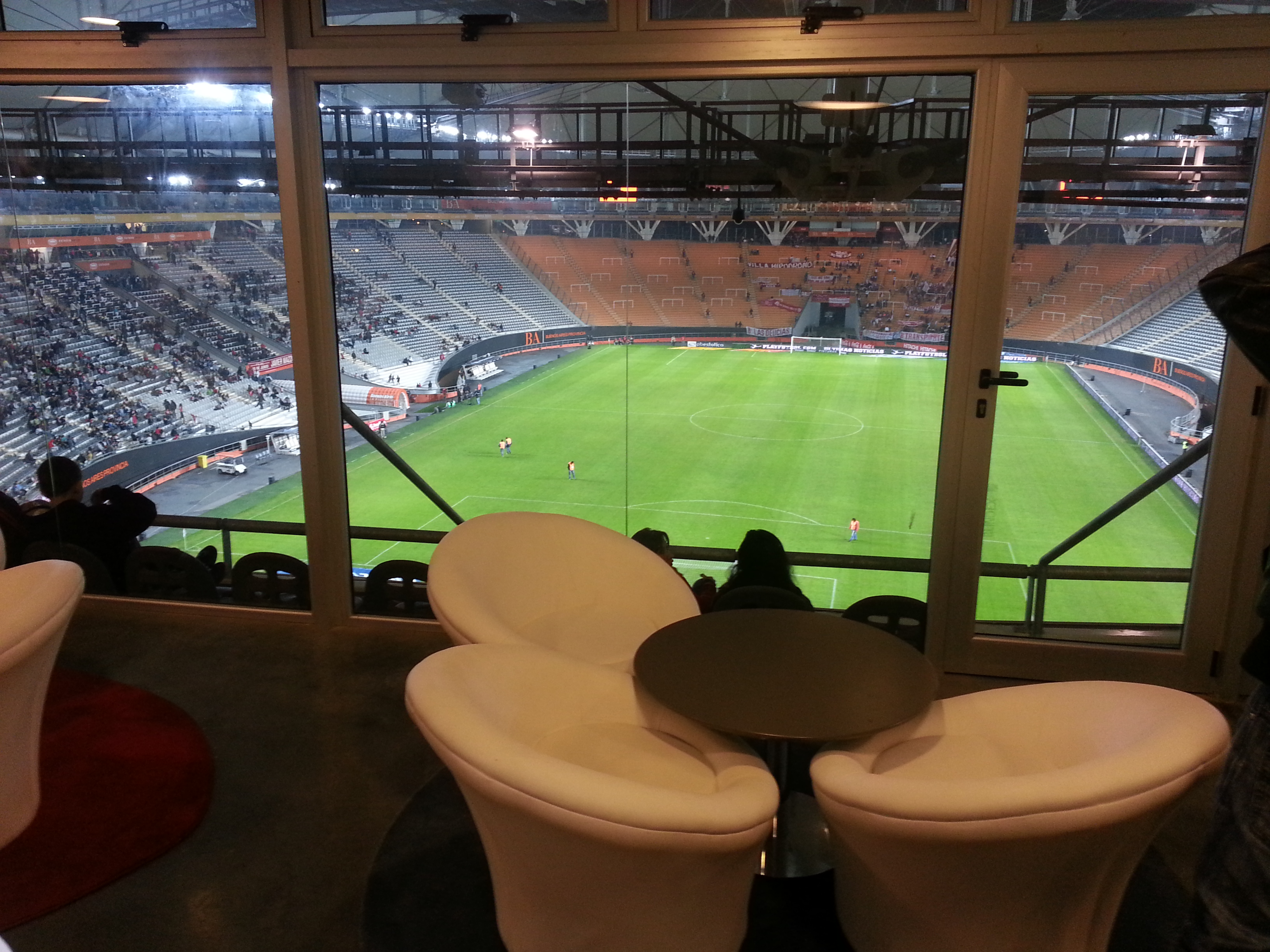
Interior view from the boxes, 2013

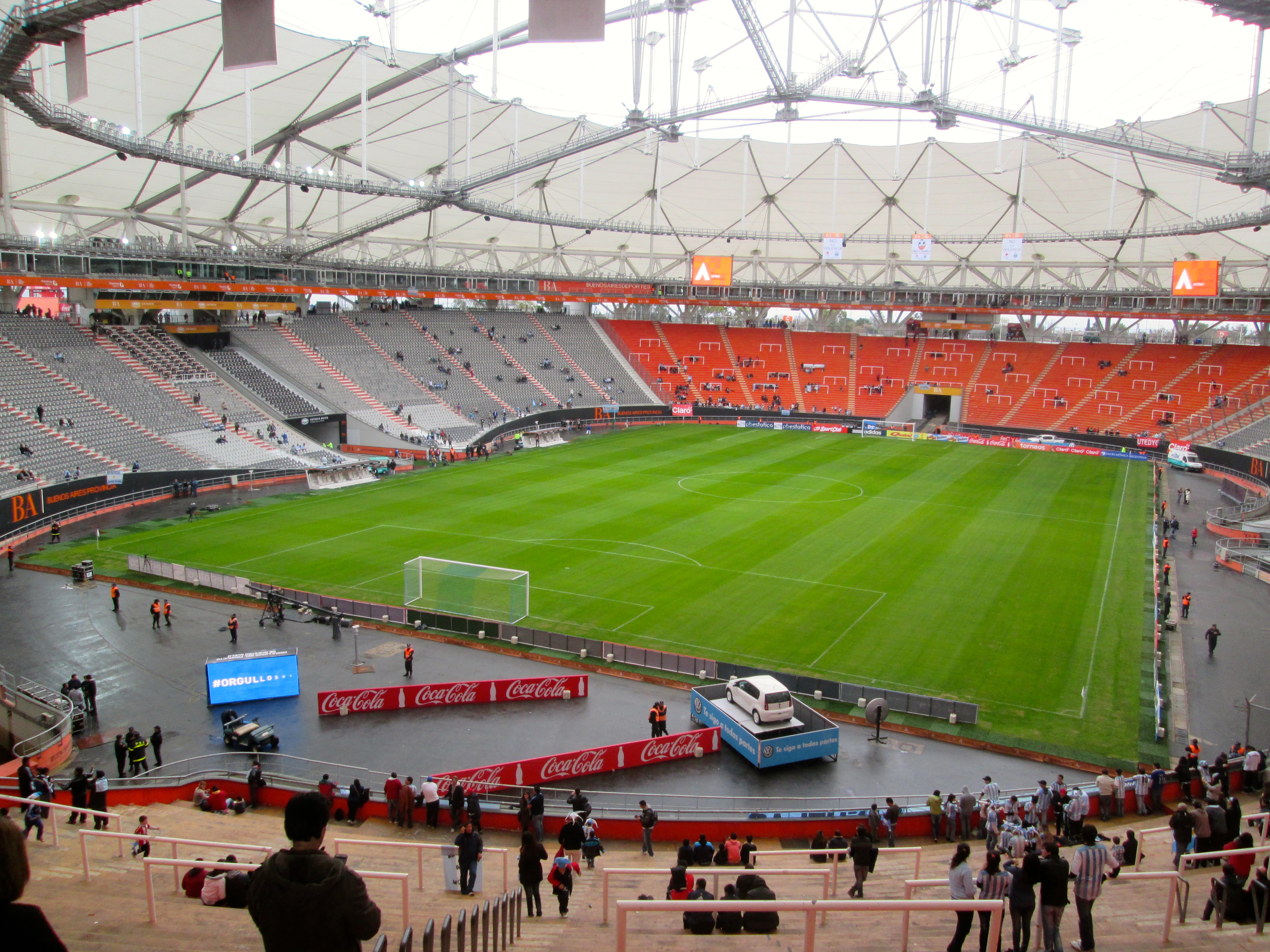
Interior view in 2014

The stadium opened on June 7, 2003. The stadium was temporarily closed to convert it into an all-seater stadium, and to install a new roof intended to cover all seats. Work had gone ahead of schedule and the roof was finished before the end of February. The stadium was officially reopened on February 17, 2011, and its first match was played six days later between Estudiantes and Deportes Tolima for the Group 7 of the 2011 Copa Libertadores.

The stadium has since become a significant venue for musicians on tour. Over 300,000 tickets to such events at the stadium were sold in 2011, ranking the La Plata Stadium fifth worldwide in performing events tickets sold.

In 2018 it was announced that the stadium's surface would be replaced by PlayMaster (a type of hybrid grass manufactured by GrandMaster Solutions) therefore Estadio Unico followed European venues such as Johan Cruyff Arena, Juventus Stadium, San Mamés Stadium, and Tottenham Hotspur Stadium, which had installed hybrid surfaces on their pitches.

After the death of Diego Maradona in November 2020, the stadium was named "Estadio Único Diego Maradona" to honor the legend. In the same way, one of its grandstands was named "Alejandro Sabella " to honor one of the most notable players from the city.

=== AFA agreement and renovation ===
In December 2024, the province of Buenos Aires' administration leaded by Axel Kicillof signed an agreement with the Argentine Football Association (AFA) for which the stadium would become the main venue for the Argentina national teams. The agreement included the stadium to be used not only for the national teams (from the senior squad to youth and women's teams) but for Primera División finals and other competitions such as Copa Argentina, and even for international tournaments. The deal was named "the new house of the whole Argentine football".

AFA took full control of Estadio Único in December 2025 so the employees of the provincial government that remained working at the stadium were moved to other areas. The agreement also specified that Buenos Aires Province would receive a canon of AR$ 1,000 million per year, plus 30% of ticket sales from non-sporting events held in the venue. The agreement is for 5 years.

As of April 2026, the stadium was under a renovation process that included the field, a new roof and lighting system, among other improvements to its structure. It is expected that Estadio Único is fully operative in November 2026.

== Sporting events ==
=== Football ===
==== Friendly matches ====
The stadium has hosted at least two friendly matches featuring the Argentina national team.

| Date | Time (UTC−03) | Team 1 | Result | Team 2 | Attend. | Notes |
|---|---|---|---|---|---|---|
| July 16, 2003 | 21:10 | Argentina | 2–2 | Uruguay | 40,000 | |
| June 7, 2014 | 14:45 | Argentina | 2–0 | Slovenia | 53,000 | |

==== 2011 Copa América ====
The stadium was confirmed as one of seven venues to host the 2011 Copa América in Argentina including the opening game. La Plata ended up hosting a total of six matches.

| Date | Time (UTC−03) | Team 1 | Result | Team 2 | Round |
|---|---|---|---|---|---|
| July 1, 2011 | 21:45 | Argentina | 1–1 | Bolivia | Group A |
| July 3, 2011 | 16:00 | Brazil | 0–0 | Venezuela | Group B |
| July 12, 2011 | 21:45 | Uruguay | 1–0 | Mexico | Group C |
| July 17, 2011 | 16:00 | Brazil | 0–0 (0–2 p.) | Paraguay | Quarterfinals |
| July 19, 2011 | 21:45 | Peru | 0–2 | Uruguay | Semifinals |
| July 31, 2011 | 16:00 | Peru | 4–1 | Venezuela | Third Place play-off |

==== 2023 FIFA U-20 World Cup ====
The stadium was confirmed as one of four venues to host the 2023 FIFA U-20 World Cup including the final.

| Date | Time (UTC−03) | Team 1 | Result | Team 2 | Round | Attendance |
|---|---|---|---|---|---|---|
| May 21, 2023 | 15:00 | Israel | 1–2 | Colombia | Group C | 7,613 |
| May 21, 2023 | 18:00 | Senegal | 0–1 | Japan | Group C | 8,625 |
| May 22, 2023 | 15:00 | England | 1–0 | Tunisia | Group E | 2,765 |
| May 22, 2023 | 18:00 | Uruguay | 4–0 | Iraq | Group E | 5,176 |
| May 24, 2023 | 15:00 | Senegal | 1–1 | Israel | Group C | 2,078 |
| May 24, 2023 | 18:00 | Japan | 1–2 | Colombia | Group C | 3,768 |
| May 25, 2023 | 15:00 | Uruguay | 2–3 | England | Group E | 27,231 |
| May 25, 2023 | 18:00 | Iraq | 0–3 | Tunisia | Group E | 8,021 |
| May 27, 2023 | 15:00 | Brazil | 2–0 | Nigeria | Group D | 29,134 |
| May 27, 2023 | 18:00 | Colombia | 1–1 | Senegal | Group C | |
| May 28, 2023 | 15:00 | Iraq | 0–0 | England | Group E | |
| May 28, 2023 | 18:00 | Honduras | 1–3 | France | Group F | |
| May 31, 2023 | 14:30 | Brazil | 4–1 | Tunisia | Round of 16 | |
| May 31, 2023 | 18:00 | England | 1–2 | Italy | Round of 16 | |
| Jun 8, 2023 | 14:30 | Uruguay | 1–0 | Israel | Semi-finals | |
| Jun 8, 2023 | 18:00 | Italy | 2–1 | South Korea | Semi-finals | |
| Jun 11, 2023 | 14:30 | Israel | 2–1 | South Korea | Third place play-off | |
| Jun 11, 2023 | 18:00 | Uruguay | 1–0 | Italy | Final | |

=== Rugby ===
==== The Rugby Championship ====
The stadium has also hosted a number of rugby matches between Argentina and New Zealand as part of The Rugby Championship, which Argentina joined in 2012.

| Date | Time (UTC−03) | Team 1 | Result | Team 2 | Round | Att. | Ref. |
|---|---|---|---|---|---|---|---|
| 29 Sep 2012 | 20:10 | Argentina | 15–54 | New Zealand | Round 5 | 53,000 | |
| 28 Sep 2013 | 19:40 | Argentina | 15–33 | New Zealand | Round 5 | 40,207 | |
| 27 Sep 2014 | 19:10 | Argentina | 13–34 | New Zealand | Round 5 | 37,000 | |

== Panorama ==
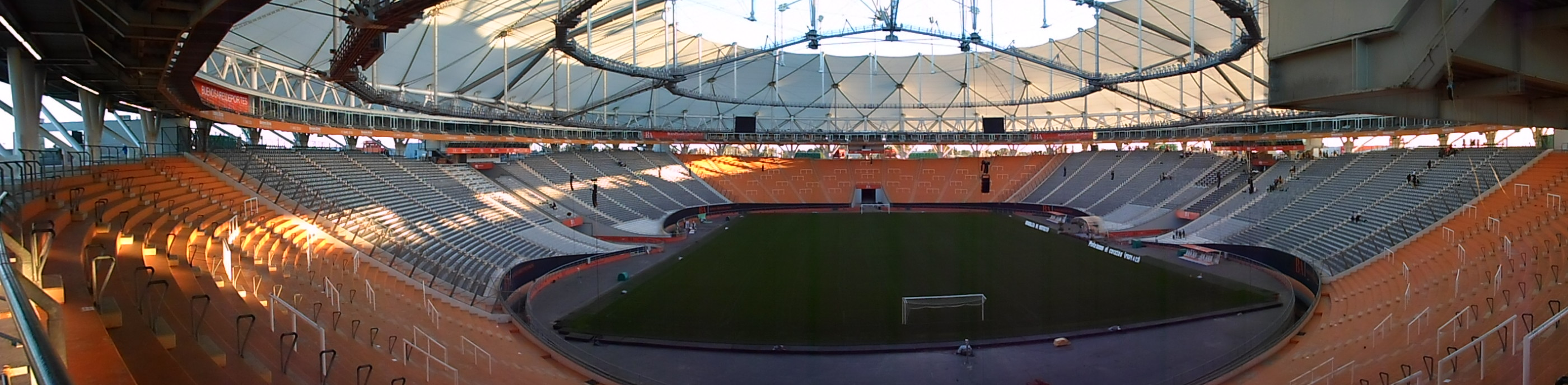
Panorama of the stadium, taken in October 2012

== Concerts ==
Concerts at Estadio Ciudad de La Plata
| Date | Artist | Tour | Attendance |
|---|---|---|---|
| 6 March 2004 | Joan Manuel Serrat | Serrat Sinfónico tour | 7,000 |
| 27 Nov 2004 | Los Piojos | Máquina de Sangre World Tour | |
| 13 Nov 2005 | Indio Solari | | 45,000 |
| 30 March, 2 and 3 April 2011 | U2 | U2 360° Tour | 172,079 |
| 8 October 2011 | Guns N' Roses | Chinese Democracy Tour | 40,000 ± |
| 28 October 2011 | Aerosmith | Back On the Road Tour | — |
| 13 November 2011 | Pearl Jam | Pearl Jam Twenty Tour | — |
| 20 November 2011 | Britney Spears | Femme Fatale Tour | 21,717 |
| 6 October 2013 | Black Sabbath | 13 Tour | — |
| 29 and 30 March 2014 | Metallica | By Request Tour | 76,407 |
| 18 January 2015 | Foo Fighters | Sonic Highways World Tour | 32,241 |
| 7 November 2015 | Pearl Jam | Pearl Jam 2015 Latin America Tour | — |
| 7, 10 and 13 February 2016 | The Rolling Stones | América Latina Olé Tour 2016 | 155,184 |
| 31 March and 1 April 2016 | Coldplay | A Head Full of Dreams Tour | 97,069 |
| 17 and 19 May 2016 | Paul McCartney | One On One Tour | 97,721 |
| 8 October 2016 | Aerosmith | Rock 'N' Roll Rumble Tour | 31,097 |
| 20 May 2017 | Ed Sheeran | ÷ Tour | 33,584 |
| 1 October 2017 | Guns N' Roses, The Who | Not in This Lifetime... Tour | 47,000 |
| 10, 11 October 2017 | U2 | The Joshua Tree Tour 2017 | 86,466 |
| 14 and 15 November 2017 | Coldplay | A Head Full of Dreams Tour | 98,197 |
| 25 November 2017 | Bruno Mars | 24K Magic World Tour | 49,204 |
| 24 March 2018 | Depeche Mode | Global Spirit Tour | 47,214 |
| 6 and 10 November 2018 | Roger Waters | Us + Them Tour | 80,693 |
| 23 and 30 April, 7 May 2022 | La Renga | Alejado de la Red | — |
| 10 December 2022 | Abel Pintos | | — |
| 28 and 29 October 2023 | Tan Bionica | La Ultima Noche Mágica | — |
| 21, 23 and 24 October 2026 | BTS | Arirang World Tour | — |

== See also ==
- List of football stadiums in Argentina
- List of rugby union stadiums by capacity
- Lists of stadiums

| Preceded by various venues in Venezuela | Copa América; Venue; 2011 | Succeeded by various venues in Chile |
| Preceded by (various venues in Poland) | FIFA U-20 World Cup; 2023 | Succeeded by Estadio Nacional Julio Martínez Prádanos; Santiago |
