= Dallmann Laboratory =

Antarctic research laboratory

Coordinates: 62°14′15″S 58°40′00″W

- Dallmann-Labor
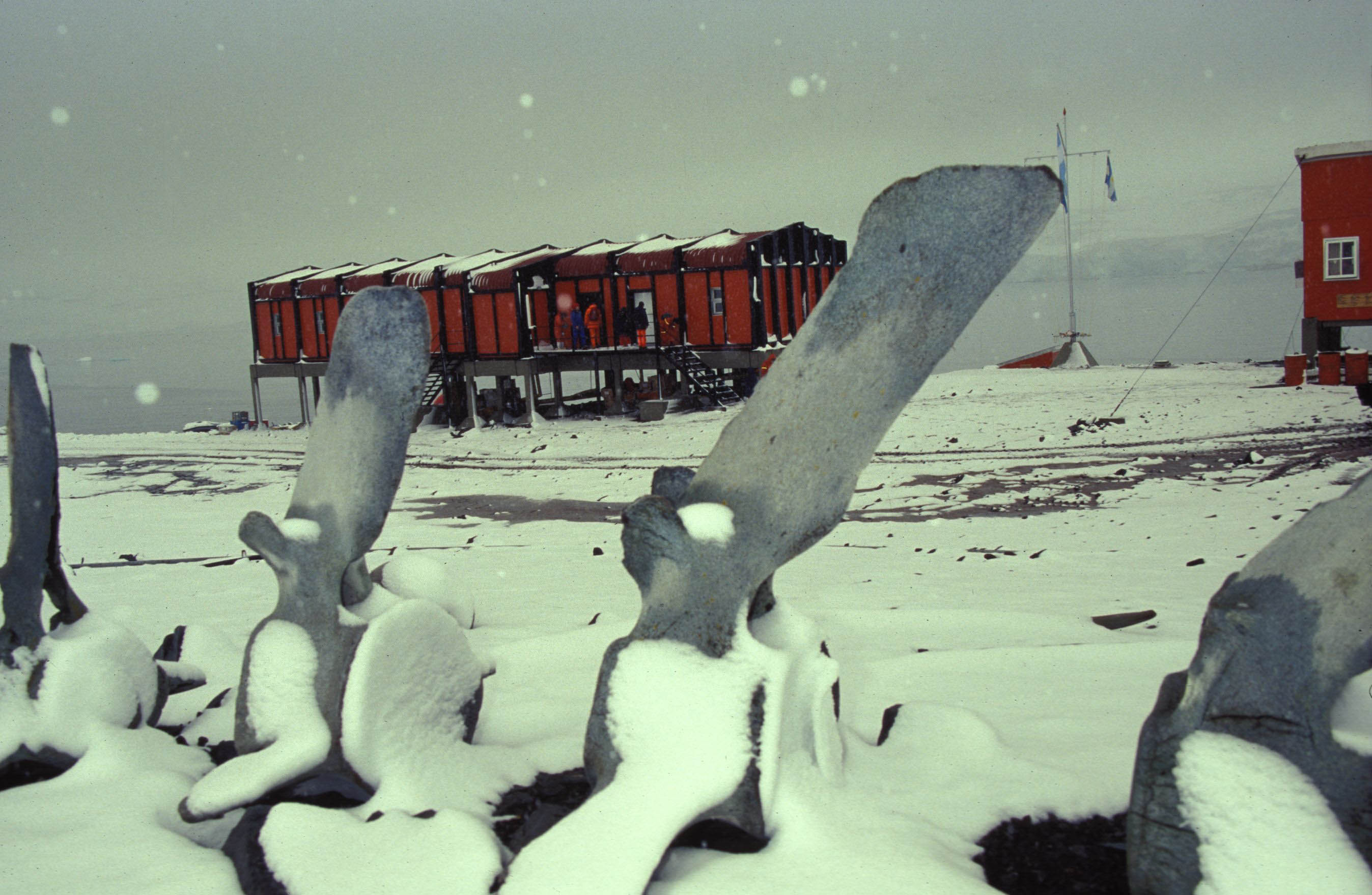
- Dallmann Laboratory, with whaling era relics in the foreground
- Established: 20 January 1994
- Laboratory type: Antarctic station
- Field of research: List: Biology; Geology; Oceanography
- Location: Potter Cove, King George Island, South Shetland Islands, Antarctica
- Operating agency: Alfred Wegener Institute
- Location within Antarctica

Dallmann Laboratory is an on-site summer laboratory on King George Island, South Shetland Islands, at the tip of the Antarctic Peninsula, adjacent to the Argentinian Carlini Base with shared logistics. It is operated by the Alfred Wegener Institute for Polar and Marine Research in cooperation with the Netherlands and Instituto Antártico Argentino. It is named after the polar sea explorer Eduard Dallmann.

It was inaugurated on 20 January 1994, has an area of 250 m^{2} (2,700 sq ft) and was built in mainland Argentina, disassembled, shipped to Potter Cove, and reassembled at the base.

The lab has three modules for bedrooms, bathroom and living-dining room, two modules for laboratories and one for the engine room and dive locker. It also has four containers for laboratory and aquarium use donated by Germany.

It has twelve workstations with laboratories, workshop, storage, aquariums and a base for research divers. It is equipped with several scientific instruments and vehicles provided by Germany: lyophilizer, stereo microscopes, freezers, a small hyperbaric chamber for transport, scuba diving equipment, aquariums, a rigid hull boat and a Kässbohrer tracked vehicle.

Multidisciplinary joint research programs are carried out in the fields of biology; coastal and terrestrial ecology; terrestrial wildlife (mostly Elephant Seals); pollution effects on birds and fish populations; oceanography; coastal geology; geosciences; etc. The station's research examines the composition and stability of algae and animal communities. Findings about the food relationships, and the physiology of the species give scientists insights into the development of the polar ecosystems facing global environmental changes.

Instituto Antártico Argentino, the Netherlands Geosciences Foundation and the Alfred Wegener Institute signed an agreement to provide a biological purification plant ceded by the Netherlands. It consists of a scrubber tank, a treatment and sludge drying plant, as well as facilities and equipment for process control and monitoring, and a set of basic spare parts and fuel reserves.

== History ==
Potter Cove in the southwestern region of King George Island was chosen around 1953 to house an Argentine naval station to support amphibious aircraft.

The station was established on November 21, 1953 and was temporarily named Refugio Potter and then Caleta Potter Naval Station. In the summer campaign from 1953 to 1954 the accommodation was occupied by only three men. The station was renamed Teniente Jubany during the 1954-1955 campaign after naval aviator Jose Isidro Jubany, who died in service on September 14, 1948.

During the summer campaign of 1957–58, two groups of scientists from the Instituto Antártico Argentino conducted geological surveys in the region, collecting petrographic and paleontological samples to study local geological upwellings. The leaders of the two groups were Dr Otto Schneider and Osvaldo C. Schauer respectively.

In 1982, the facilities were transferred to Instituto Antártico Argentino and the station was raised to base status, and inaugurated as such on 12 February.

In 1990, the Alfred Wegener Institute for Polar and Marine Research in Germany began talks with Instituto Antártico Argentino, which was looking at installing on-site laboratories and aquariums with modern equipment for scientific research. Dallmann Laboratory was then inaugurated on January 20, 1994.

In 1994, the LAJUB laboratory for greenhouse effect research was set up in collaboration with the Institute for Atmospheric Physics (IFA), Italy.

On March 5, 2012, the base was renamed Base Carlini by Executive Decree 309/2012 to honor the late explorer Alejandro Ricardo Carlini.

On December 8, 2013, Metallica held a concert at the base under a small, purpose-built dome without amplification due to environmental concerns, which was streamed worldwide.

German-Argentine joint inauguration of the Dallmann Laboratory in 1994

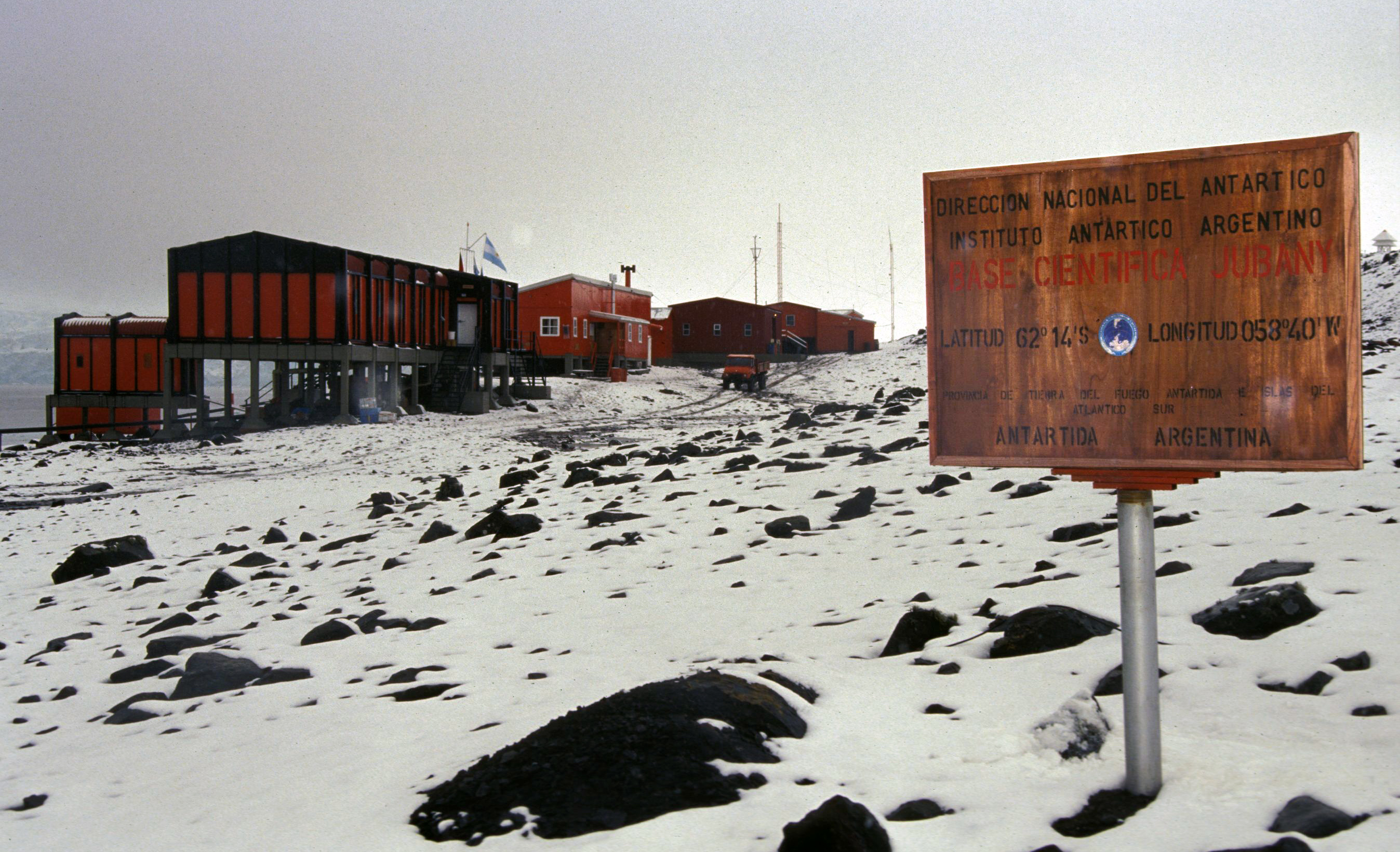

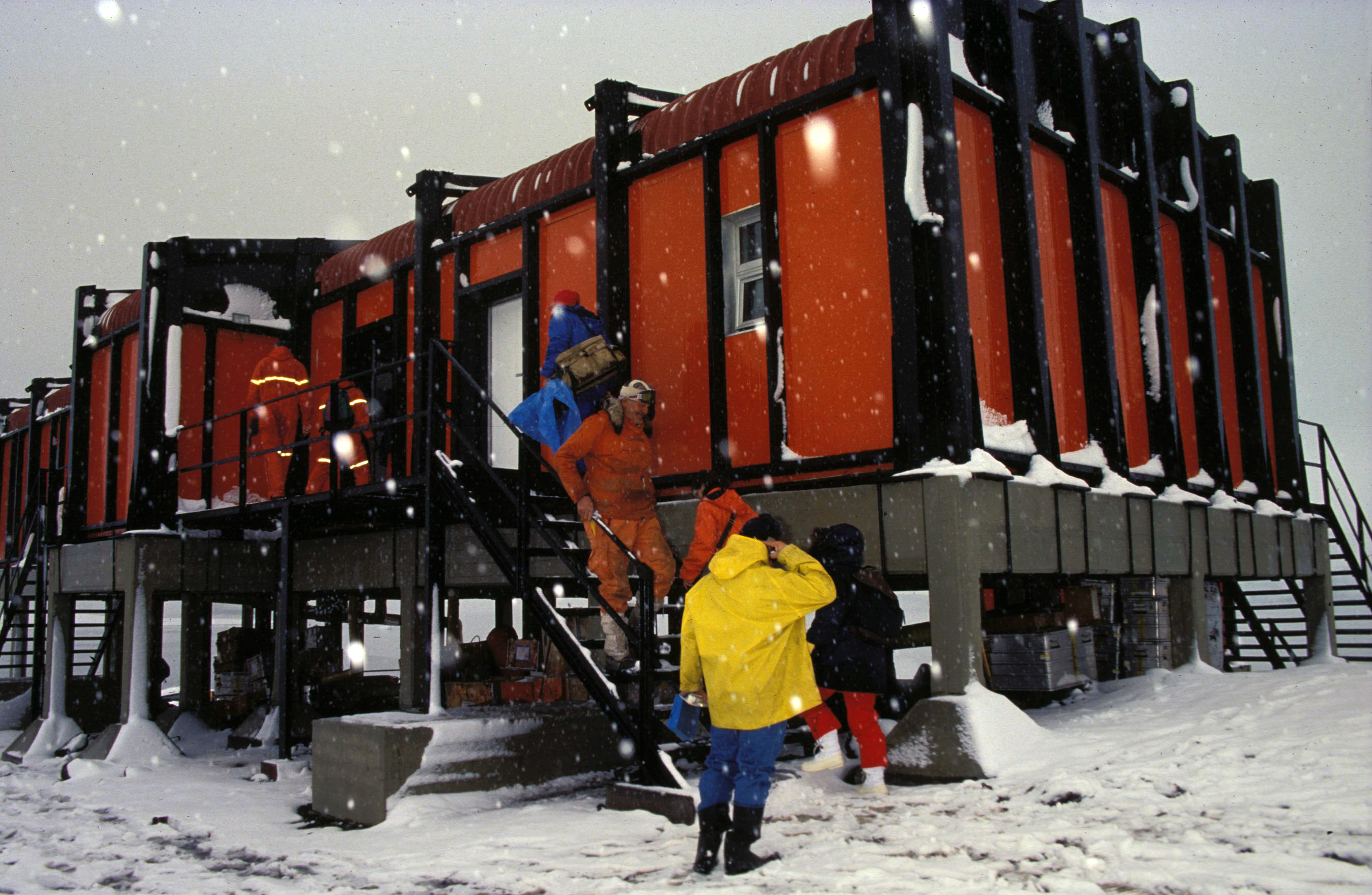

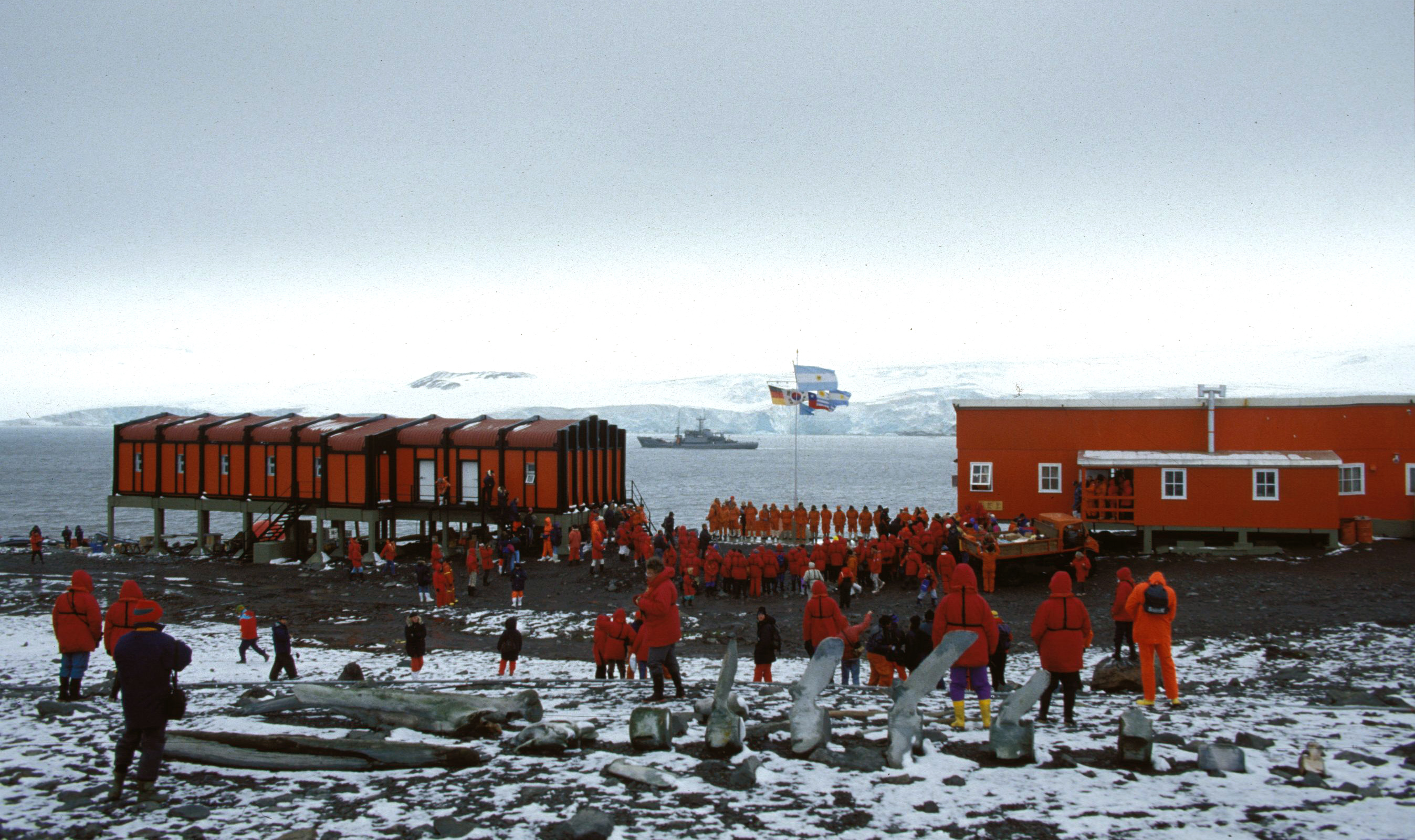
