= Live Earth concert, Antarctica =

Concert event

Live Earth
- Genre: Pop and rock music
- Dates: July 7, 2007
- Locations: Rothera Research Station, Antarctica
- Years active: 2007
- Founders: Al Gore, Kevin Wall
- Website: Live Earth US Site

The Live Earth concert in Antarctica was held at Rothera Research Station, one in a series of Live Earth concerts that took place on July 7, 2007, in all seven continents. The band Nunatak performed as the lone act. Nunatak's performances, though performed in front of only 17 people, were broadcast all over the world. It was the first rock concert ever performed in Antarctica.

== Running order ==
- Nunatak - "How Many People", "Would You Do It All Again" (AN 16:00)

== Coverage ==
=== Television ===
In the U.S., NBC Universal's networks had exclusive television rights.

=== Satellite Radio ===
Live Earth was carried on all major satellite radio carriers in the US such as XM Satellite Radio and Sirius Satellite Radio.

=== Internet ===
All of Live Earth was broadcast online at liveearth.msn.com.

Recordings of Nunatak were made available on the British Antarctic Survey website and YouTube channel.

== See also ==
Freeze 'Em All
