= St. Jakob-Park =

Sports stadium in Basel

- Joggeli
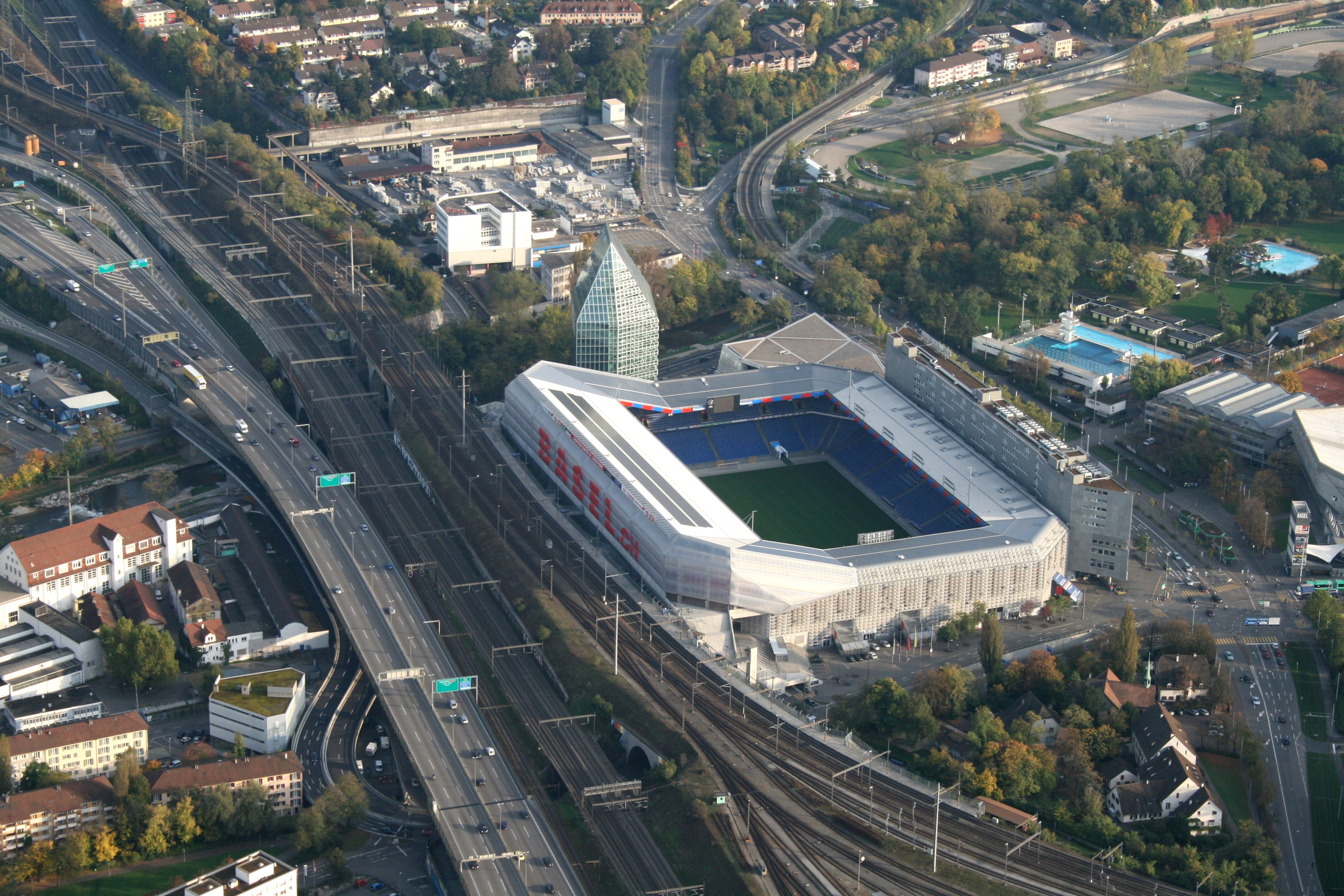
- UEFA
- Interactive map of St. Jakob-Park
- Location: Basel, Switzerland
- Coordinates: 47°32′30″N 7°37′13″E
- Owner: Genossenschaft Stadion St. Jakob-Park
- Operator: Basel United AG
- Capacity: 38,512 (Football); 37,500 (for international matches); 40,000 (Concerts)
- Surface: Grass

Construction
- Groundbreaking: 1998
- Opened: 15 March 2001
- Expanded: 2005–2006
- Cost: CHF 220 million (2001)
- Architect: Herzog & de Meuron

Tenants
- FC Basel (2001–present); Switzerland national football team

St. Jakob-Park (Swiss Standard German: [zaŋkt ˈjaːkɔb ˌpark]) is a Swiss sports stadium in Basel. It is the largest football venue in Switzerland and home to FC Basel. "Joggeli", as the venue is nicknamed by the locals, was originally built with a capacity of 33,433 seats. The capacity was increased to 42,500 for Euro 2008, which was hosted by Austria and Switzerland. After the tournament, a number of seats were removed, thus creating more space between them. The capacity was therefore reduced to 38,512 for Swiss Super League matches or 37,500 seats for international matches The maximum capacity for concerts is 40,000.

The stadium is named after the village of St. Jakob an der Birs, which stood on the site. The name "Joggeli" is the diminutive of "Jakob" in the local dialect, making it the equivalent of "Jake".

== Overview ==
The stadium is divided into four main blocks, A, B, C and D, each block covering one side of the stadium, and block G, consisting of the upper balcony added later. St. Jakob Park is a fairly modern stadium; construction started on 13 December 1998, replacing the former St. Jakob Stadium. The re-opening game took place on 15 March 2001.

The "Genossenschaft S.J.P" officially owns the stadium, while the stadium itself is managed by "Basel United". The stadium cost around CHF 220 million to build (US$132 million, €143 million in March 2001).

Within the stadium, there are 32 shops on three different floors, as well as two restaurants (the "Restaurant UNO" and "Hattrick Sports Bar"). It has parking spaces for 680 cars on two different floors.

The stadium can be reached either by bus, tram or train (the stadium has its own train station).

The stadium has been awarded 4 stars by UEFA, which is the highest number of stars that can be awarded to a stadium of that size.

In 2006, there was a riot after a match between FC Basel and FC Zürich.

== UEFA Euro 2008 ==
For UEFA Euro 2008, St. Jakob Park hosted six games – three group games involving Switzerland (including the opening match), two quarter-finals, and one semi-final. Torrential rain during the 11 June match left the pitch in such a poor state that the entire grass surface was re-laid, the first time such a decision was made at a tournament of this size.

Date	Time (CET)	Team #1	Result	Team #2	Round	Spectators
7 June 2008	18:00	Switzerland	0–1	Czech Republic	Group A	39,730
11 June 2008	20:45	Switzerland	1–2	Turkey	Group A	39,730
15 June 2008	20:45	Switzerland	2–0	Portugal	Group A	39,730
19 June 2008	20:45	Portugal	2–3	Germany	quarter-finals	39,374
21 June 2008	20:45	Netherlands	1–3 (a.e.t.)	Russia	quarter-finals	38,374
25 June 2008	20:45	Germany	3–2	Turkey	semi-final	39,374

== UEFA Europa League Final 2016 ==
The stadium hosted the 2016 final of the Europa League. Sevilla beat Liverpool 3–1.

This was the first European club final hosted at the stadium, although the previous stadium of the same name, the St. Jakob Stadium, which opened in 1954 for the 1954 FIFA World Cup and closed in 1998, hosted four European Cup Winners' Cup finals in 1969, 1975, 1979 and 1984.

== UEFA Women's Euro 2025 ==
For UEFA Women's Euro 2025, St. Jakob Park hosted five games – three group games (including Switzerland in the opening match), one quarter-final, and the final.

Date	Time (CET)	Team #1	Result	Team #2	Round	Spectators
2 July 2025	21:00	Switzerland	1–2	Norway	Group A	34,063
8 July 2025	18:00	Germany	2–1	Denmark	Group C	34,165
13 July 2025	21:00	Netherlands	2–5	France	Group D	34,133
19 July 2025	21:00	France	1–1 (5–6 pen.)	Germany	Quarter-finals	34,128
27 July 2025	18:00	England	1–1 (3–1 pen.)	Spain	Final	34,203

== Panorama ==
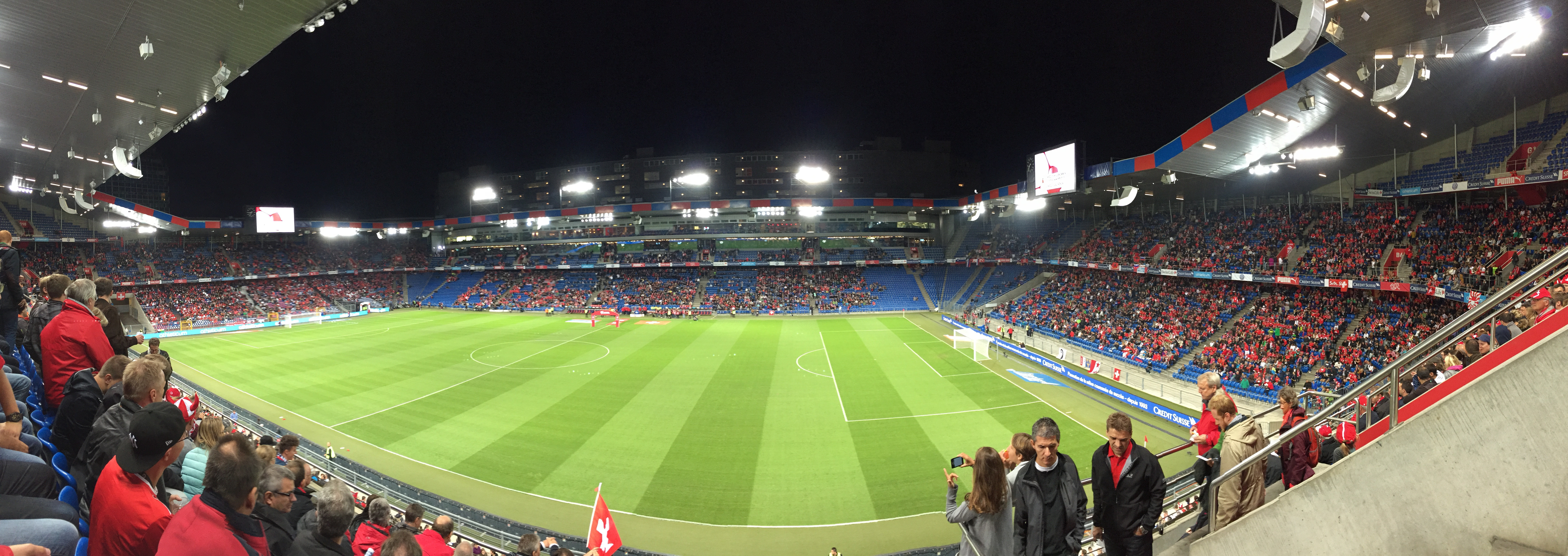

== International matches ==
Date		Result		Competition
21 August 2002	Switzerland	3–2	Austria	Friendly
8 September 2002	Switzerland	2–0	Georgia	UEFA Euro 2004 qualifying
7 June 2003	Switzerland	2–2	Russia	UEFA Euro 2004 qualifying
11 October 2003	Switzerland	2–0	Republic of Ireland	UEFA Euro 2004 qualifying
2 June 2004	Switzerland	0–2	Germany	Friendly
4 September 2004	Switzerland	6–0	Faroe Islands	2006 FIFA World Cup Qualification
8 September 2004	Switzerland	1–1	Republic of Ireland	2006 FIFA World Cup Qualification
3 September 2005	Switzerland	1–1	Israel	2006 FIFA World Cup Qualification
1 March 2006	Croatia	3–2	Argentina	Friendly
27 May 2006	Switzerland	1–1	Ivory Coast	Friendly
2 September 2006	Switzerland	1–0	Venezuela	Friendly
6 September 2006	Austria	0–1	Venezuela	Friendly
15 November 2006	Switzerland	1–2	Brazil	Friendly
2 June 2007	Switzerland	1–1	Argentina	Friendly
17 October 2007	Switzerland	0–1	United States	Friendly
26 March 2008	Switzerland	0–4	Germany	Friendly
12 August 2009	Switzerland	0–0	Italy	Friendly
5 September 2009	Switzerland	2–0	Greece	2010 FIFA World Cup Qualification
14 October 2009	Switzerland	0–0	Israel	2010 FIFA World Cup Qualification
7 September 2010	Switzerland	1–3	England	UEFA Euro 2012 qualifying
12 October 2010	Switzerland	4–1	Wales	UEFA Euro 2012 qualifying
6 September 2011	Switzerland	3–1	Bulgaria	UEFA Euro 2012 qualifying
11 October 2011	Switzerland	2–0	Montenegro	UEFA Euro 2012 qualifying
26 May 2012	Switzerland	5–3	Germany	Friendly
14 August 2013	Switzerland	1–0	Brazil	Friendly
8 September 2014	Switzerland	0–2	England	UEFA Euro 2016 qualifying
5 September 2015	Switzerland	3–2	Slovenia	UEFA Euro 2016 qualifying
6 September 2016	Switzerland	2–0	Portugal	2018 FIFA World Cup Qualification
7 October 2017	Switzerland	5–2	Hungary	2018 FIFA World Cup Qualification
12 November 2017	Switzerland	0–0	Northern Ireland	2018 FIFA World Cup Qualification
26 March 2019	Switzerland	3–3	Denmark	UEFA Euro 2020 qualifying
6 September 2020	Switzerland	1–1	Germany	2020–21 UEFA Nations League
14 November 2020	Switzerland	1–1	Spain	2020–21 UEFA Nations League
1 September 2021	Switzerland	2–1	Greece	Friendly
5 September 2021	Switzerland	0–0	Italy	2022 FIFA World Cup Qualification
18 November 2023	Switzerland	1–1	Kosovo	UEFA Euro 2024 qualifying
5 September 2025	Switzerland	4–0	Kosovo	2026 FIFA World Cup Qualification
8 September 2025	Switzerland	3–0	Slovenia	2026 FIFA World Cup Qualification
27 March 2026	Switzerland	3–4	Germany	Friendly

== Concerts ==
- AC/DC performed as the first act at the stadium on 6 July 2001, as part of their Stiff Upper Lip tour.
- Metallica also performed at the venue on 4 July 2014, as part of their By Request tour.
- The stadium hosted a public screening of the final of the Eurovision Song Contest 2025 on 17 May 2025.

== See also ==
- List of football stadiums in Switzerland
- Lists of stadiums

Preceded by National Stadium; Warsaw	UEFA Europa League; Final venue 2016	Succeeded by Friends Arena; Stockholm (Solna)
