= Lords of Summer Tour =

2015 concert tour by Metallica

- World tour by Metallica
- Location: Europe; North America; South America
- Associated album: "Lords of Summer" single
- Start date: May 9, 2015
- End date: September 19, 2015
- Legs: 1
- No. of shows: 16

Metallica concert chronology
- Metallica By Request Tour (2014); Lords of Summer Tour (2015); WorldWired Tour (2016–2019)

The Lords of Summer Tour was a concert tour by the American heavy metal band Metallica in support of their single "Lords of Summer", which was released on March 19, 2014.

== Set list ==
Set list from Quebec City, Canada (September 16, 2015)

1. "Creeping Death"
2. "Master of Puppets"
3. "Battery"
4. "Harvester of Sorrow"
5. "Ride the Lightning"
6. "The Unforgiven II"
7. "St. Anger"
8. "Wherever I May Roam"
9. "Sad But True"
10. "Welcome Home (Sanitarium)"
11. "The Frayed Ends of Sanity"
12. "One"
13. "For Whom the Bell Tolls"
14. "Fade to Black"
15. "Seek and Destroy"
  Encore
16. "Turn the Page"
17. "Nothing Else Matters"
18. "Enter Sandman"

== Tour dates ==
List of 2015 concerts, showing date, city, country, venue, and opening act
Date (2015)	City	Country	Venue	Opening act
May 9	Las Vegas	United States	Las Vegas Festival Grounds	Linkin Park
May 29	Gelsenkirchen	Germany	Veltins-Arena	Faith No More
May 31	Munich	Germany	Olympiastadion	Faith No More
June 2	Milan	Italy	Assago Summer Arena	Faith No More
June 4	Vienna	Austria	Donauinsel	Faith No More
June 6	Austin	United States	Circuit of the Americas	—N/a
August 1	Chicago	United States	Grant Park	Tame Impala
August 20	Bergen	Norway	Bergenhus Fortress	Meshuggah
August 22	Gothenburg	Sweden	Ullevi	Meshuggah
August 25	Saint Petersburg	Russia	SKK Arena	Fourtones
August 27	Moscow	Russia	Olympic Stadium	Jack Action
August 29	Reading	England	Richfield Avenue	Bring Me the Horizon
August 30	Leeds	England	Bramham Park	Bring Me the Horizon
September 14	Quebec City	Canada	Colisée Pepsi	Gojira
September 16	Quebec City	Canada	Centre Vidéotron	Baroness
September 19	Rio de Janeiro	Brazil	City of Rock	Mötley Crüe

The tour's Quebec City stops served as the final event held at Colisée Pepsi before its closure, and the first-ever concert event held at its replacement, Videotron Centre.

== Personnel ==
- James Hetfield – lead vocals, rhythm guitar
- Lars Ulrich – drums
- Kirk Hammett – lead guitar, backing vocals
- Robert Trujillo – bass, backing vocals
