= Carlini Base =

Antarctic research station

Carlini Station Ex Jubany (Note: Before presidential decree 309/2012, which changed its name to the present one)
- Antarctic base
- Base Carlini
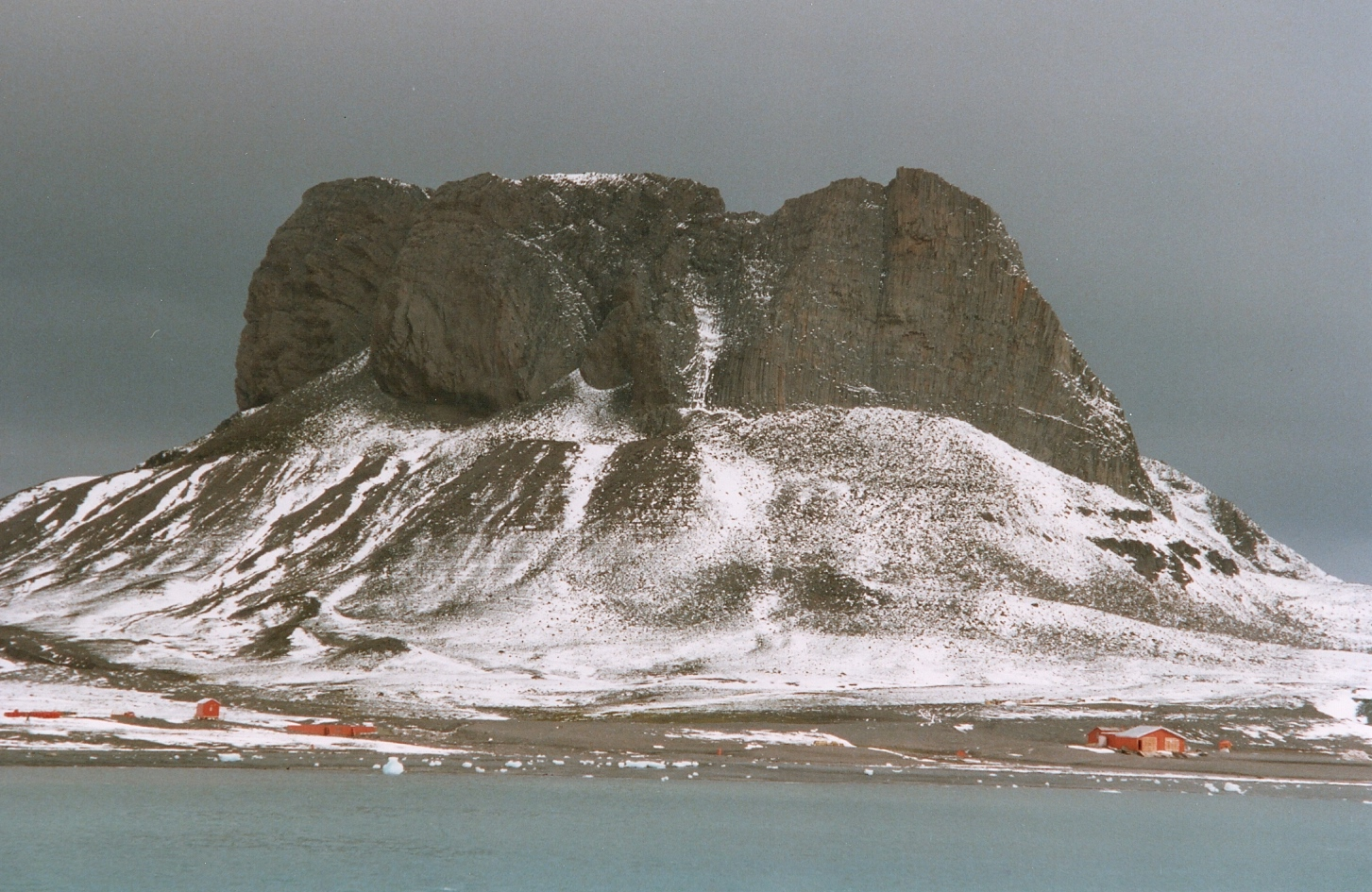
- Carlini with mount Tres Hermanos (English: Three Brothers) in the background

- Location of Carlini Station in Antarctica
- Coordinates: 62°14′18″S 58°40′04″W
- Country: Argentina
- Province: Tierra del Fuego, Antarctica, and South Atlantic Islands Province
- Department: Antártida Argentina
- Region: South Shetland Islands
- Location: Potter Cove; King George Island; Antarctica
- Established: November 21, 1953 (1953–54 austral summer season)
- Named after: Alejandro Ricardo Carlini

Government (Note: Operated by Argentine Antarctic Institute)
  - Type: Directorate
  - Body: Argentine National Antarctic Directorate
- Elevation: 10 m (33 ft)

Population (2017)
  - Summer: 80
  - Winter: 29
- Time zone: UTC-3 (ART)
- UN/LOCODE: AQ JUB
- Type: All year-round
- Period: Annual
- Status: Operational
- Activities: List: Seismography; Biology; Oceanography
- Facilities: List: Main house; Heliport; Emergency house; Technical staff houses; General personnel houses; Infirmary; Radio station; Main and auxiliary power plants; Vehicle fleet; Vehicle garage; Workshop; Laboratories (2: meteorology, seismography, biology, oceanography); Geodetic GPS receiver station; Seismography station; Warehouse and deposits; Freezing chamber; Waste treatment station; Various multiple use buildings; Movie theater

Carlini Base (Spanish: Base Carlini), formerly known as Jubany Base, is an Argentine permanent base and scientific research station named after scientist Alejandro Ricardo Carlini (previously it had been named after Argentine naval pilot José Isidro Jubany). It is located on Potter Cove, King George Island, in the South Shetland Islands.

As of 2014, Carlini is one of 13 research bases in Antarctica operated by Argentina.

== History ==
Potter Cove, in the southwestern region of the King George Island (known as Isla 25 de Mayo in Argentina) in the South Shetland archipelago was chosen around 1953 to host an Argentine naval station for amphibious aircraft support.

The refuge was established on 21 November 1953, being temporarily called Refugio Potter and then Caleta Potter Naval Station. In the summer campaign of 1953–54 the shelter was inhabited by only three men. It was proposed to name the base after naval aviator Jose Isidro Jubany, killed on duty on 14 September 1948; the station was thus renamed as Teniente Jubany in the course of the 1954–55 campaign.

In the summer campaign of 1957–1958, two groups of scientists working for the Argentine Antarctic Institute conducted geological survey work in the area, collecting petrographic and paleontological samples to study local geological upward movements. Dr. Otto Schneider was head of the first group, and Osvaldo C. Schauer, chief of the second.

In 1982, the naval station facilities were transferred to the Argentine Antarctic Institute, and the station was upgraded to the status of base, being inaugurated as such on 12 February.

In 1990, the Alfred Wegener Institute of marine research, Germany, began talks with the Argentine National Antarctic Institute, dealing with the installation of on-site laboratories and aquariums with modern equipment for scientific research. This new facility—named Dallmann Laboratory—was inaugurated on 20 January 1994.

In 1994, the LAJUB laboratory for greenhouse effect research was installed in collaboration with the Institute of Atmospheric Physics (IFA), Italy.

On 5 March 2012, by decree 309/2012 of the Executive, the base was renamed to Base Carlini, after the late researcher Dr. Alejandro Ricardo Carlini, of distinguished trajectory in Antarctic scientific studies.

On 8 December 2013, Metallica performed a concert at the base, under a small specially-built dome and without amplification due to environmental concerns. The show was streamed worldwide.

== Description ==
Since its upgrade to base status in 1982, Carlini's facilities have been continuously improved; as of 2014 they include: main, emergency, technical staff and personnel houses; weather station; LAJUB Laboratory; Dallmann Laboratory; infirmary; radio station; power plant (both main and auxiliary, just for emergencies); garage and workhouse; freezing chamber; warehouse for supplies; incinerator and compactor for residues; installations for fuel pump, heat generation and fuel filtering and purification; various multiple use buildings; fuel tank array; antenna; heliport; geodetic GPS receiver station and seismography station. This adds to a maximum lodging capacity for 80 people. As of 2017 it has an average winter population of 29 people.

The base is located next to a colony of more than 16,000 penguins and 650 sea lions. The usual route to reach the base includes a flight from Ushuaia to Marambio Base, and then sailing for a few days.

Carlini enables scientists from different areas to develop advanced research projects in the disciplines of the natural sciences. These tasks increase during the more active summer campaigns. For example, there have been studies on human behavior and its biochemical correlations; ecological aspects of benthic, planktonic and coastal populations; censuses within pinniped colonies (mainly elephant seals and fur seals); physical chemistry and biology of lakes, ponds and other water bodies; tracing of ecotoxicological elements in the Antarctic ecosystem; continuous monitoring of long-term sea level in geology and geophysics operations; coastal ecology and microbiology; effect of UV radiation on marine phytoplankton and bacteria; etc.

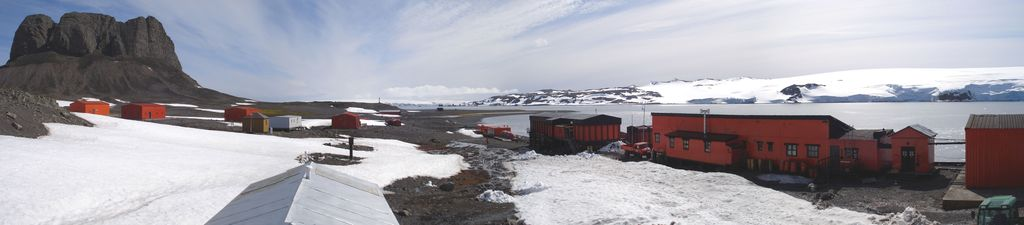
Panoramic photo of Carlini Base, 2008 austral summer

=== LACAR Laboratories ===
The LACAR (Laboratorio Antártico Multidisciplinario Carlini) laboratories—former 'LAJUB' when the station designation was Jubany—are formed by two facilities / buildings: LACAR-Cabildo and LACAR-Catedral.

Of these two buildings, the LACAR-Cabildo is focused on hosting and maintaining different kinds of equipment—belonging to many projects—for the purposes of data collection; while the LACAR-Catedral holds four laboratories for sample handling and analysis related to various scientific disciplines.

These two buildings, like the rest of the Multidisciplinary Laboratories at the Argentinean permanent Antarctic Stations (LAMBI -at Marambio station-, LABEL -at Belgrano II station-, LABES -at Esperanza station-, LABORC -at Orcadas Station- and LASAN at San Martín station) are managed by the Scientific Coordination area of the Argentinean Antarctic Institute.

== Climate ==
Climate data for Carlini Base (1991–2020, extremes 1986–2022)
Month	Jan	Feb	Mar	Apr	May	Jun	Jul	Aug	Sep	Oct	Nov	Dec	Year
Record high °C (°F)	12.7 (54.9)	13.6 (56.5)	11.0 (51.8)	8.7 (47.7)	7.2 (45.0)	8.6 (47.5)	6.5 (43.7)	5.4 (41.7)	9.0 (48.2)	9.1 (48.4)	8.5 (47.3)	11.5 (52.7)	13.6 (56.5)
Mean daily maximum °C (°F)	4.3 (39.7)	3.9 (39.0)	2.9 (37.2)	0.9 (33.6)	−0.4 (31.3)	−2.5 (27.5)	−3.0 (26.6)	−2.6 (27.3)	−1.2 (29.8)	0.2 (32.4)	1.7 (35.1)	3.2 (37.8)	0.6 (33.1)
Daily mean °C (°F)	2.2 (36.0)	2.0 (35.6)	0.9 (33.6)	−1.2 (29.8)	−2.8 (27.0)	−5.2 (22.6)	−5.8 (21.6)	−5.3 (22.5)	−3.7 (25.3)	−1.9 (28.6)	−0.2 (31.6)	1.2 (34.2)	−1.6 (29.1)
Mean daily minimum °C (°F)	0.4 (32.7)	0.2 (32.4)	−1.2 (29.8)	−3.4 (25.9)	−5.3 (22.5)	−8.1 (17.4)	−9.0 (15.8)	−8.3 (17.1)	−6.5 (20.3)	−4.2 (24.4)	−2.2 (28.0)	−0.6 (30.9)	−4.0 (24.8)
Record low °C (°F)	−4.2 (24.4)	−7.0 (19.4)	−10.0 (14.0)	−18.5 (−1.3)	−24.5 (−12.1)	−24.0 (−11.2)	−27.3 (−17.1)	−25.5 (−13.9)	−23.5 (−10.3)	−18.0 (−0.4)	−11.6 (11.1)	−9.0 (15.8)	−27.3 (−17.1)
Average precipitation mm (inches)	45.9 (1.81)	54.4 (2.14)	59.9 (2.36)	49.9 (1.96)	65.2 (2.57)	36.9 (1.45)	33.7 (1.33)	23.6 (0.93)	33.8 (1.33)	42.7 (1.68)	35.8 (1.41)	37.7 (1.48)	519.5 (20.45)
Average snowy days	10.1	8.4	12.3	15.1	16.2	17.0	17.5	17.9	17.7	19.2	15.6	12.9	180.1
Mean monthly sunshine hours	83.7	65.0	52.7	24.0	12.4	0.0	3.1	18.6	45.0	55.8	84.0	93.0	537.3
Mean daily sunshine hours	2.7	2.3	1.7	0.8	0.4	0.0	0.1	0.6	1.5	1.8	2.8	3.0	1.5
Source: Servicio Meteorológico Nacional (precipitation 2001–2010)

== See also ==
- Argentine Antarctica
- List of Antarctic research stations
- List of Antarctic field camps
