= Centre Vidéotron =

Indoor arena in Quebec City

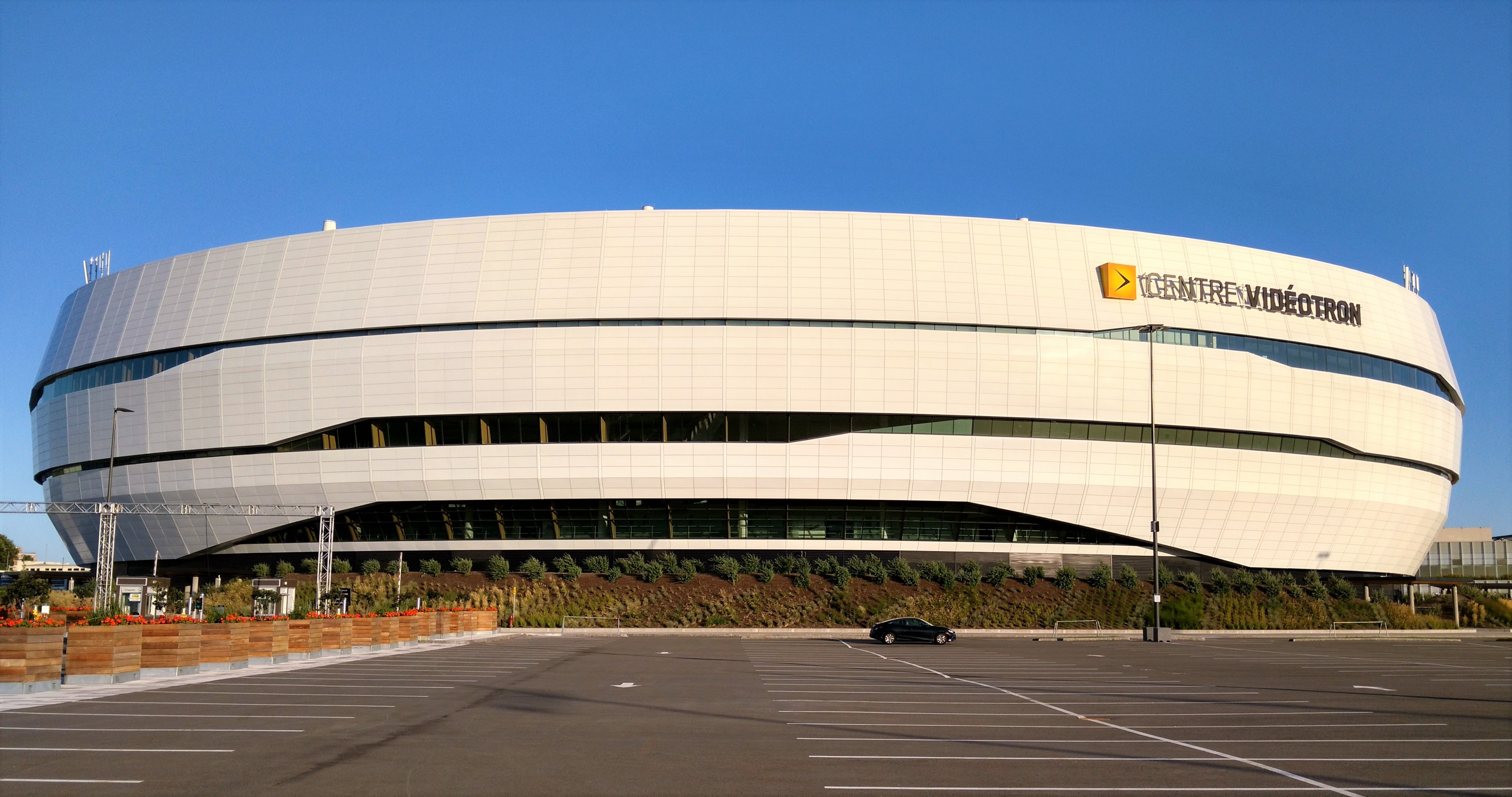
- Interactive map of Centre Vidéotron
- Former names: Amphithéâtre de Québec (planning stages and during construction)
- Address: 250-B Boulevard Wilfrid-Hamel
- Location: Quebec City, Quebec
- Coordinates: 46.829°N 71.248°W
- Owner: Municipality of Quebec City
- Operator: Québecor Média
- Capacity: Concerts: 20,396; Ice hockey: 10,500–18,259
- Field size: 64,000 m^{2}

Construction
- Groundbreaking: September 3, 2012
- Opened: September 12, 2015
- Cost: $370 million
- Architects: Populous; ABCP Architecture; GLCRM & Associates
- Project manager: Genivar
- Structural engineer: SNC-Lavalin
- Services engineer: SNC-Lavalin
- General contractors: Pomerleau, Inc.

Tenant
- Quebec Remparts (QMJHL) 2015–present

Centre Vidéotron is an indoor arena in Quebec City, Quebec, Canada. The 18,259-seat arena replaced the old Colisée Pepsi as Quebec City's primary venue for indoor events. The arena is primarily used for ice hockey, serving as the home arena of the Quebec Remparts of the QMJHL and has been prospected as a venue for a new or re-located National Hockey League team in Quebec City, and as part of a Winter Olympic Games bid. The building opened on September 8, 2015. It is now the 18th-largest ice hockey arena in North America, and the second-largest that does not host an NHL team.

== History ==
A ground-breaking ceremony for the new arena was held on September 3, 2012, attended by then-Québecor Chairman Pierre Karl Péladeau, then-Premier of Quebec Jean Charest, and former Quebec Nordiques players Michel Goulet, Peter Šťastný, and Alain Côté. Arena construction began on September 10, 2012.

The arena was expected to cost $400 million, but cost $370 million instead, with the city and province covering 50% of the cost of the arena. On March 1, 2011 Québecor entered into an agreement to acquire management rights to the new arena, a deal expected to be between $33 million and $63 million up front, plus between $3.15 million and $5 million in annual rent. The value of the deal will increase if an NHL franchise moves into the arena; Québecor has actively backed an expansion franchise for Quebec City. This arrangement was made without public tender, for which the provincial government provided legal immunity.

As part of the management contract, Québecor also holds the arena's naming rights; on April 7, 2015, it was announced that the arena would carry the name of Québecor-owned cable company Vidéotron, and be known as the Centre Vidéotron.

The arena held its official opening on September 3, running public two-hour tours for the following three days. It hosted its first Quebec Remparts game on September 12, with a game against the Rimouski Oceanic setting a QMJHL attendance record of 18,259. On January 19, 2025, the first Professional Women's Hockey League (PWHL) game in Quebec City was played at the arena between the Ottawa Charge and the Montreal Victoire, the Victoire won the game 2–1 in front of a sell-out crowd of 18,259 fans. The PWHL returned on January 11, 2026 for a game between the Vancouver Goldeneyes and the Montreal Victoire. The PWHL returned on January 23, 2027 for a game between the Boston Fleet and Montreal Victoire.

== Design ==
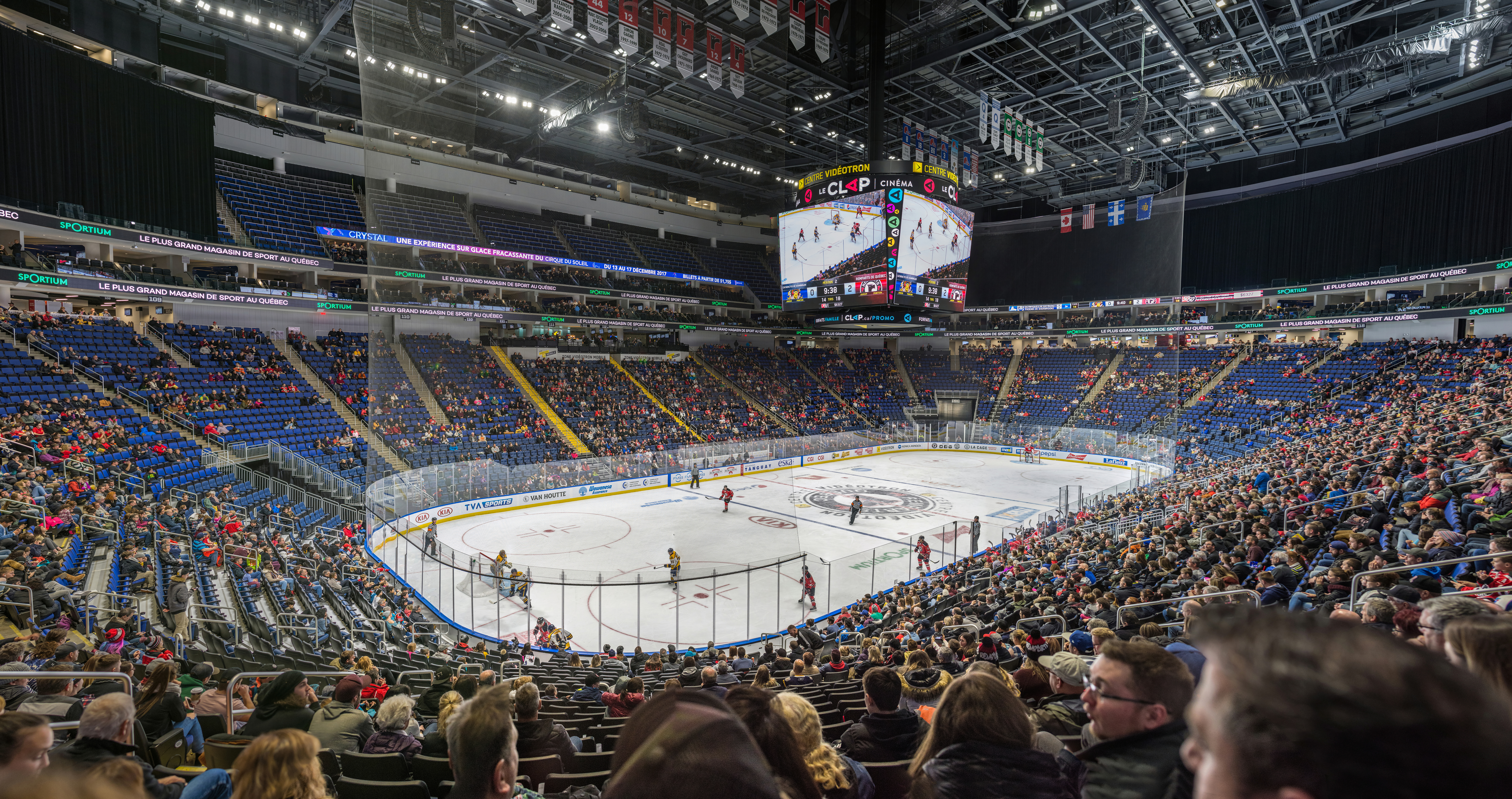
Inside the arena during an ice hockey game between the Quebec Remparts and the Shawinigan Cataractes on November 17, 2017

The arena is comparable in size to PPG Paints Arena, the home arena of the Pittsburgh Penguins, and occupies approximately 64,000 square metres of space, down from the originally proposed 70,000 square metres. The design is also similar to Rogers Place, the home arena of the Edmonton Oilers. A television studio, valued at between C$30 million and C$40 million, is constructed within the arena.

Populous architect and lead project designer Kurt Amundsen described the arena as having a "hockey-first" design suiting the preferences of Canadian fans (who Amundsen described as being more interested in the game itself rather than in-arena entertainment), with a bowl that is "as steep and tight as it could possibly get", allowing spectators to "feel like [they] are on top of the ice". The angle of the upper seating bowl is so steep that rails had to be installed at every row to satisfy local building code requirements.

== Notable events ==
Two days after playing the last event of its predecessor, Colisée Pepsi, Metallica played the first-ever concert at Centre Vidéotron on September 16, both as part of their Lords of Summer Tour.

Madonna performed to a sold-out crowd of over 13,000 people on September 21, 2015, part of her Rebel Heart Tour.

Canadian singer Shania Twain has performed multiple sold-out concerts in the venue with the first being on October 9, 2015 as part of her Rock This Country Tour, which she had said would be her final tour. Three years later, she came back with the Now Tour on June 28, 2018. Her last concert held here was on June 17, 2023 during her Queen of Me Tour, performing for over 13,300 patrons and grossing over $1.5 million.

Rihanna played at the venue on April 5, 2016 as an act of her Anti World Tour.

To this day, Celine Dion is the singer who has played the venue the most times, for a total of 8 concerts. During her Summer Tour 2016, she played the arena 5 times in front of 67,368 spectators. In 2019, she launched her Courage World Tour at the arena with 3 concerts in front of 39,930 spectators.

Billie Eilish performed at the venue on September 29, 2024 as the first show for her Hit Me Hard and Soft: The Tour.

Centre Vidéotron has hosted the Quebec International Pee-Wee Hockey Tournament since 2016.

American professional wrestling promotion WWE hosted two televised episodes of WWE Raw from the venue on Monday, August 21, 2023 and Monday, August 11, 2025. Prior to that night, Quebec wrestling historian Pat Laprade stated in Le Journal de Québec that the first event would be the very first televised WWE event to ever take place in Quebec City. On March 27, 2024, All Elite Wrestling hosted televised episodes of AEW Dynamite and AEW Rampage at the venue.

Centre Vidéotron hosted its first NBA basketball game as part of the pre-season NBA Canada Series on Oct. 3, 2026. The Miami Heat defeated the Toronto Raptors with a final score of 129–105.
