= Nunatak (band) =

Band based at Rothera Research Station, Antarctica

- Nunatak rehearsing for the Live Earth Concert

Background information
- Origin: Rothera, British Antarctic Territory, Antarctica
- Genres: Indie rock
- Years active: 2006–2007, 2012
- Label: Unsigned
- Members: Matt Balmer; Tris Thorne; Alison Massey; Rob Webster; Roger Stilwell
- Website: Antarctic rock band Nunatak

Nunatak were a British-Antarctic indie rock band formed at the British Antarctic Survey’s (BAS) Rothera Research Station and acted as the base's house band. The five person band was part of a science team investigating climate change and evolutionary biology on the Antarctic Peninsula. They are chiefly known for their participation in Live Earth in 2007, where they were the only band to play in the event's Antarctica concert.

== History ==
The band's name is the Greenlandic word for a mountain top protruding from an ice sheet. Originally, the band had named itself after a disease previously common to Punta Arenas roughly translated to "Rat Shit Death" but felt that the pronunciation of that name was less than politically correct.

The band disbanded in 2007, as its members returned to the United Kingdom, but they reunited to perform in the Sanday, Orkney Soulka festival in 2012.

== Live Earth ==
Nunatak played the Live Earth Antarctica concert on July 7, 2007, to a "sell out" crowd of seventeen, the entire population of the Rothera Research Station. Their participation fulfilled the event's promise to hold a concert on all seven continents. Lead singer Matt Balmer, 22, said of the event that the band "expected to spend our Antarctic winter here at Rothera quietly getting on with our work and maybe performing at the occasional Saturday night party. We could never have imagined taking part in a global concert."

In the buildup to the event, Director of BAS Professor Chris Rapley said:

The need to reduce our carbon emissions to avoid serious climate change is one of the greatest challenges humans have had to confront – is a complex issue that will only be solved by us all working together – scientists, politicians and society. Right now, Antarctic scientists and our colleagues in the Arctic are taking part in International Polar Year - the biggest ever globally co-ordinated research effort – to help find the way forward. Hopefully, Live Earth will make a real difference in public awareness and attract talented young people to become scientists – it’s a cool job with a real purpose. I am looking forward to Nunatak’s appearance in the Live Earth concert inspiring young people the world over.

British Antarctic Survey cameraman Pete Bucktrout made videos of the band's performances that were transmitted back from Antarctica for later inclusion in Live Earth. The videos are available on the BAS website and the BAS YouTube channel.

== Line up ==
- Matt Balmer – lead vocals and guitar (electronics engineer with the physics and meteorology team)
- Tris Thorne – violin (communications engineer)
- Ali (Alison) Massey – saxophone (marine biologist)
- Rob Webster – drums (meteorologist)
- Roger Stilwell – bass guitar (Field General Assistant (polar guide))
