= Metallica By Request Tour =

2014 concert tour by Metallica

- World tour by Metallica
- Location: Europe; North America; South America
- Start date: March 16, 2014
- End date: August 9, 2014
- Legs: 3
- No. of shows: 26
- Box office: $43,800,000+

Metallica concert chronology
- Summer Tour 2013 (2013); Metallica By Request Tour (2014); Lords of Summer Tour (2015)

The Metallica By Request Tour was a concert tour by the American heavy metal band Metallica in support of their single "Lords of Summer", which was released on March 19, 2014. An interactive tour, concertgoers could vote, via internet, which songs Metallica would include on each night's setlist and, at the concert, via SMS, to a song in the encore. Metallica debuted a new song, called "Lords of Summer". Metallica's only stop in North America was in Montreal for the Heavy Montreal festival.

== Tour dates ==
List of 2014 concerts, showing date, city, country, venue, and opening act
Date (2014)	City	Country	Venue	Opening act	Attendance	Gross
March 16	Bogotá	Colombia	Simón Bolívar Park	Nepentes; Recycled Orchestra of Cateura; De La Tierra	30,974 / 34,137	$2,857,030
March 18	Quito	Ecuador	Parque Bicentenario	Mad Brain; Recycled Orchestra of Cateura; De La Tierra	32,257 / 32,257	$3,877,959
March 20	Lima	Peru	Estadio Nacional de Lima	Recycled Orchestra of Cateura; De La Tierra	27,858 / 31,600	$1,925,090
March 22	São Paulo	Brazil	Estádio do Morumbi	Raven	61,742 / 63,347	$5,696,363
March 24	Asunción	Paraguay	Hipódromo de Asunción	Recycled Orchestra of Cateura; De La Tierra	28,277 / 32,200	$2,256,140
March 27	Macul	Chile	Estadio Monumental David Arellano	Recycled Orchestra of Cateura	43,296 / 43,296	$3,508,790
March 29	La Plata	Argentina	Estadio Ciudad de La Plata	Cirse; Recycled Orchestra of Cateura	76,407 / 78,902	$4,792,140
March 30	La Plata	Argentina	Estadio Ciudad de La Plata	Cirse; Recycled Orchestra of Cateura	76,407 / 78,902	$4,792,140
May 28	Helsinki	Finland	Hietaniemi beach	Slayer; Mastodon; Ghost; Gojira	—N/a	—N/a
May 30	Stockholm	Sweden	Royal National City Park	Slayer; Mastodon; Ghost; Gojira	49,430 / 54,000	$7,173,380
June 1	Oslo	Norway	Valle Hovin	Slayer; Mastodon; Ghost; Gojira	—N/a	—N/a
June 3	Horsens	Denmark	Horsens Statsfængsel	Slayer; Mastodon; Ghost; Gojira	35,000 / 35,000	$4,442,697
June 4	Hamburg	Germany	Volksparkstadion	Slayer; Mastodon; Ghost	43,518 / 43,518	$4,272,566
June 6	Nuremberg	Germany	Zeppelinfeld	Avenged Sevenfold; Alter Bridge; In Extremo	—N/a	—N/a
June 8	Nürburg	Germany	Nürburgring	Avenged Sevenfold; Alter Bridge; In Extremo	—N/a	—N/a
June 9	Landgraaf	Netherlands	Megaland	Avenged Sevenfold; Biffy Clyro; Rob Zombie	—N/a	—N/a
June 28	Pilton	England	Worthy Farm	Jack White; Robert Plant	—N/a	—N/a
July 1	Rome	Italy	Ippodromo delle Capannelle	Alice in Chains; Volbeat; Kvelertak	—N/a	—N/a
July 3	Werchter	Belgium	Werchter Park	Placebo; Skrillex; Robert Plant	—N/a	—N/a
July 4	Basel	Switzerland	St. Jakob-Park	Alice in Chains; Airbourne	—N/a	—N/a
July 6	Knebworth	England	Knebworth House	Alice in Chains; Mastodon; Airbourne	—N/a	—N/a
July 8	Prague	Czech Republic	Incheba Open Air	Alice in Chains; Children of Bodom; Kvelertak	—N/a	—N/a
July 9	Vienna	Austria	Trabrennbahn Krieau	Alice in Chains; Children of Bodom; Kvelertak	—N/a	—N/a
July 11	Warsaw	Poland	National Stadium	Alice in Chains; Anthrax; Kvelertak	—N/a	—N/a
July 13	Istanbul	Turkey	ITU Stadium	Mezarkabul	—N/a	—N/a
August 9	Montreal	Canada	Parc Jean-Drapeau	Anthrax; Dropkick Murphys; Apocalyptica	—N/a	—N/a
Total					460,455+	$43,800,000+

== Personnel ==
- James Hetfield – lead vocals, rhythm guitar
- Lars Ulrich – drums
- Kirk Hammett – lead guitar, backing vocals
- Robert Trujillo – bass, backing vocals
