= Dan Reed Network =

American funk rock band

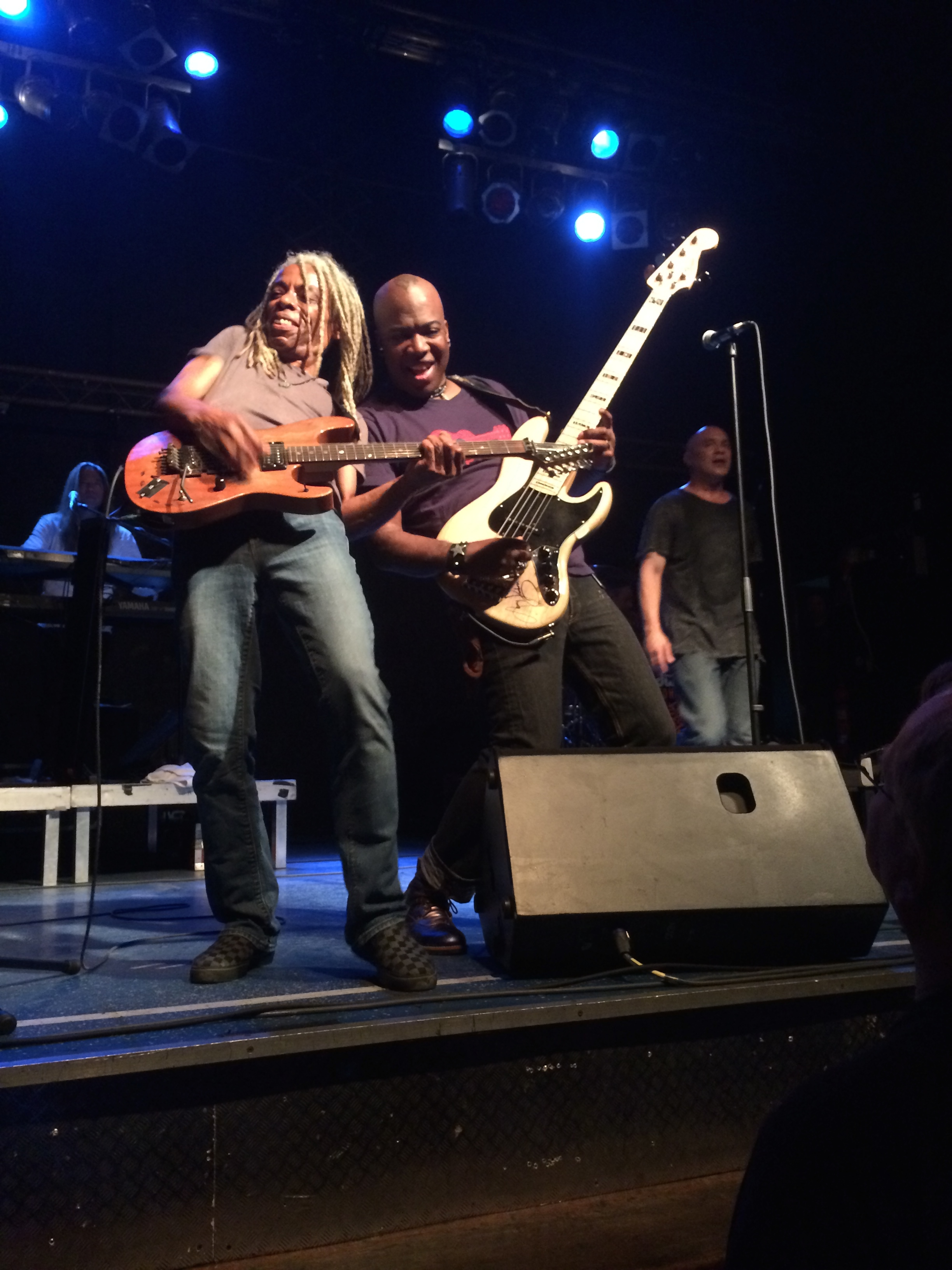
- Brion James, Melvin Brannon and Dan Reed in 2014

Background information
- Origin: Portland, Oregon, U.S.
- Genres: Rock; funk rock; synth rock
- Years active: 1984–1993, 2012, 2013, 2015–present
- Labels: Nu Vision, Mercury/Polygram, Frontiers
- Members: Dan Reed; Melvin Brannon II; Brion James; Dan Pred; Rob Daiker
- Past members: Jeff Siri; Rick DiGiarllonado; Blake Sakamoto
- Website: danreed-network.com

Dan Reed Network is an American funk rock band formed in 1984 by Dan Reed in Portland, Oregon. They released several albums during the 1980s and achieved one top-40 hit on the Billboard Hot 100 in 1988.

== History ==
=== Formation ===
Dan Reed (born 1963 in Portland, Oregon) met Dan Pred in high school in Aberdeen, South Dakota, and after a time studying music studies at Northern State University, the pair returned to Portland and formed the Dan Reed Network in 1984. In 1986, they made their first recording, a six-track EP called Breathless, which included a No. 1 single, "Steal Me", on Z-100 in Portland, Oregon.

The lineup was Dan Reed on vocals and guitar, Brion James on guitar, Melvin Brannon II on bass guitar, Dan Pred on drums, and Rick DiGiallonardo (formerly of Portland platinum rockers Quarterflash) on keyboard. DiGiallonardo, who was married with one child, was replaced by Blake Sakamoto on keyboard; Sakamoto, of Japanese heritage, had returned from Los Angeles, where he had been playing with future Atlantic Records artist Dear Mr. President. Lead singer Julian Raymond became vice president of Capitol Records.

In 1988, The Washington Post described the band as "easily charming [...] with an unlikely brand of heavy metal-ish rock sharpened by junk funk and plenty of rock 'n' roll theatrics".

=== Record deal ===
The band signed to Mercury Records with the help of Derek Shulman and were managed by Bill Graham. In late 1987, the group released an eponymous debut album, which was produced by Bruce Fairbairn and was mixed by Mike Fraser at Little Mountain Sound Studios in Vancouver, British Columbia. They released their first single, "Ritual", which peaked at No. 38 on the Billboard Hot 100. The song also received a music video.

The album Dan Reed Network received a four-star write-up from Rolling Stone. The Washington Post compared the Dan Reed Network's debut album to its live performances, saying, "numbers such as 'Get to You,' irritatingly synth-heavy on the record, were played with enough soul and engagingly invidious guitar to redeem them."

Def Leppard's album, Hysteria (1987), was having disappointing sales, according to Mercury. Def Leppard's managers, Cliff Burnstein and Peter Mensch, offered Dan Reed Network a Hysteria tour in the US if they would switch to their management company, Q Prime. By the beginning of 1989, they signed with Q Prime.

=== 1989–1997 ===
While at the Rock 'n' Roll Hall of Fame induction ceremony in January 1989, Dan Reed met Nile Rodgers. The album Slam was produced by Rodgers; the new collection had internal problems at Mercury Records. The band later toured Europe in the winter of 1989/1990 to support Bon Jovi. The Rolling Stones selected the band as their main support for their first tour in nearly 10 years. The band played at the Steel Wheels/Urban Jungle Tour of Europe in the summer of 1990. The tour later led to Sakamoto working as the Stones' road manager.

Dan Reed Network's third album, The Heat (1991), was their most successful in the UK, but Mercury Records did not promote the band. The band continued without tour support from the label, including a period supporting Baby Animals in Australia, and what would be their final tour through Europe in the summer of 1993, which began 29 June in Varberg, Sweden and ended on 8 August in London, England. In October, the band members agreed to go on a hiatus, not officially breaking up.

A live album called Live at Last (Halfway Around the World) was released in 1997. This album was compiled from hours of tapes from Blake Sakamoto. He and drummer Dan Pred auditioned several versions of each song to comprise a comprehensive 2-CD live set. A companion video, filmed live in Portland on New Year's Eve of 1991, also called Live at Last, was released at the same time.

Dan Reed Network played a one-time-only reunion show on New Year's Eve 2012 with all original band members in Portland, Oregon. The band announced on January 12, 2013, they would play further concerts together in both the United States and Europe. This would be their first UK show in two decades, headlining the Enchanted Festival at Greenwoods Spa, Chelmsford, on October 12, 2013. The band reunited on November 9 at the Roseland Theater, Oregon.

=== Anthology ===
In 2013, Dan Reed Network collaborated with PledgeMusic on a new compilation album. This album was to include live versions of songs and was a double CD set with online access and various other bonus options. The funding achieved 143%, and the album was shipped in late January 2014.

=== Fight Another Day ===
Following Anthology, the band returned to creating music. Blake Sakamoto was unavailable, so he was replaced with Rob Daiker to play keyboard on the album. Fight Another Day was released by Frontiers Music SRL on June 3, 2016. This was followed with a world tour in 2016 and a further European tour early in 2017. According to Dan Reed, the band was not satisfied with the label's promotion for the album, so they decided not to work with them in the future.

=== Origins ===
In 2018, the band produced an album consisting of new and old songs, with some older songs being newly recorded. Origins was released by AOR Heaven/Soulfood. The album was recorded in various studios in Manchester, New York, Portland, and Stockholm.

=== Let’s Hear It for the King ===
In late 2019, the band went on tour in Europe to play anniversary shows of the album Slam. At the same time, the band produced a new album in Portland. According to Dan Reed, it would be funky and heavy. Dan Reed Network's album Let’s Hear It for the King was released by Drakkar Entertainment on March 4, 2022. The single/video "Starlight" was released on October 22, 2021.

== Dan Reed ==
Reed continued to do solo work and collaborate with other musicians, including Nuno Bettencourt from the band Extreme. Reed provided vocals for a 1992 rap-rock collaboration with the basketball team Portland Trail Blazers, "Bust a Bucket".

In the mid-1990s, Dan Reed formed a new band and released an album called Adrenaline Sky in 1998 under his own name. The first half of the record was recorded in a studio, while the second half contains live recordings from the 1996 concert. The songs are written in the style of alternative rock and grunge. Reed released an EP called Sharp Turn in 2004. The EP is in an electronica style. Reed toured Europe and the US during 2008 and 2009. Selections from these solo acoustic shows appear on An Evening with Dan Reed.

In May 2009, Reed played many UK shows, including a house concert in York. In 2010, Reed (with a newly assembled band) performed a series of shows throughout Europe. A performance on March 5 at Union Chapel in London was filmed for release as a DVD. The show featured new material from Coming Up For Air as well as some classic DRN hits. Coming Up for Air, a solo album by Reed, was released in 2010. On February 26, 2013, Dan Reed released his second solo album, Signal Fire. On March 31, 2015, Dan Reed released his third solo album called Transmission. This album was crowdfunded via Pledge Music. The most recent solo album by Dan Reed, titled Confessions, was released in 2017 via Zero One Entertainment.

Reed has left the United States for political reasons. After spending one year in India and three years in Jerusalem, where he built a recording studio, he moved to Paris for three years. In 2011, he moved to Prague, where he currently resides.

== Members ==
=== Current ===
- Dan Reed – vocals, guitars, piano (1984–1993, 2012–present)
- Brion James – guitars (1984–1993, 2012–present)
- Melvin Brannon II – bass (1984–1993, 2012–present)
- Dan Pred – drums, percussion, electronics (1984–1993, 2012–present)
- Rob Daiker – keyboards (2015–present)

=== Former ===
- Jeff Siri – keyboards (1984–1985)
- Rick DiGiarllonado – keyboards (1985–1987)
- Blake Sakamoto – keyboards (1987–1993, 2012–2015)

== Discography ==
=== Dan Reed Network ===
Year	Album	US Top 200	UK Albums
1986	Breathless (EP)	—	–
1988	Dan Reed Network	95	–
1989	Slam	160	66
1991	The Heat	—	15
1993	Mixin' It Up: The Best of Dan Reed Network	—	—
1997	Live at Last! Halfway Around the World	—	—
2002	The Collection	—	—
2014	Anthology	—	—
2016	Fight Another Day	—	—
2018	Origins	—	—
2022	Let's Hear It for the King	—	—

=== Singles ===
Year	Name	US Hot 100	UK Singles
1988	"Ritual"	38	—
1988	"Get to You"	—	—
1988	"I'm So Sorry"	—	—
1989	"Tiger in a Dress"	—	—
1990	"Come Back Baby"	—	51
1990	"Rainbow Child"	—	60
1990	"Make It Easy"	—	—
1990	"Stardate 1990"	—	39
1990	"Lover"	—	45
1991	"Mix It Up"	—	49
1991	"Baby Now I"	—	65
2016	"Divided"	—	—
2016	"The Brave"	—	—
2016	"Champion"	—	—
2017	"B There with U"	—	—
2017	"Save the World"	—	—
2017	"Infected"	—	—
2018	"Fade to Light"	—	—
2018	"One Last Time"	—	—
2021	"Starlight"	—	—

=== Dan Reed ===
- Adrenaline Sky (1998)
- Sharp Turn (EP, 2004) Universal Music Enterprises
- An Evening with Dan Reed (2009)
- Coming Up for Air (2010)
- Studio Sessions - Dan Reed and Rob Daiker Live in the Studio (DVD, 2010)
- Signal Fire (2013)
- Transmission (2015)
- Confessions (2017)

== Sources ==
- "Picks and Pans", People Magazine, April 4, 1988.
- Wayne Robins, "On the Reed Network", Newsday (New York), May 14, 1988.
- Alona Wartofsky, "The Dan Reed Network", The Washington Post, May 27, 1988.
- Kim Neely, "Album Reviews: Dan Reed Network", Rolling Stone, August 11, 1988.
