= Damage Inc =

Damage, Inc. is a song by Metallica

Damage Inc may refer to:

- Damage Incorporated, a 1997 computer game
- Damage Inc. Pacific Squadron WWII, a 2012 combat flight sim
- Damage, Inc. Tour, the name of a Metallica concert tour
- Damage, Inc. (video game), a canceled video game featuring Metallica band members
