= Master of Puppets =

Studio album by Metallica
- Released: March 3, 1986
- Recorded: September 1 – December 27, 1985
- Studio: Sweet Silence (Copenhagen)
- Genre: Thrash metal
- Length: 54:52
- Label: Elektra
- Producers: Metallica; Flemming Rasmussen

Metallica chronology
Ride the Lightning (1984)	Master of Puppets (1986)	The $5.98 E.P. – Garage Days Re-Revisited (1987)

Singles from Master of Puppets
- 1. "Master of Puppets" Released: July 2, 1986

Master of Puppets is the third studio album by the American heavy metal band Metallica, released on March 3, 1986, by Elektra Records. Recorded in Copenhagen, Denmark, at Sweet Silence Studios with producer Flemming Rasmussen, it is the band's final album to feature bassist Cliff Burton. While touring in support of Master of Puppets, he died on September 27, 1986, after the band's tour bus was involved in an accident in Dörarp, Sweden.

The album's artwork, designed by Metallica and Peter Mensch and painted by Don Brautigam, depicts a cemetery field of white crosses tethered to strings, manipulated by a pair of hands in a clouded, blood-red sky, with a fiery orange glow on the horizon. The album is the band's most recent to date to feature a runtime of under an hour. Instead of releasing a single or video in advance of the album's release, Metallica embarked on a five-month American tour in support of Ozzy Osbourne. The European leg was canceled after Burton's death in September 1986, and the band returned home to audition a new bassist.

Master of Puppets peaked at number 29 on the Billboard 200 and received widespread acclaim from critics, who praised its music and political lyrics. It is widely regarded to be one of the greatest and most influential metal albums of all time, and is credited with consolidating the American thrash metal scene. It was certified 8× platinum by the Recording Industry Association of America (RIAA) in 2025 for shipping eight million copies in the United States, and was later certified 6× Platinum by Music Canada and single platinum by the British Phonographic Industry (BPI). In 2015, Master of Puppets became the first metal recording to be selected by the Library of Congress for preservation in the National Recording Registry for being "culturally, historically, or aesthetically significant." The album was remastered and reissued as an expanded box set in 2017.

== Background and recording ==
Metallica's 1983 debut Kill 'Em All laid the foundation for thrash metal with its aggressive musicianship and vitriolic lyrics. The album revitalized the American metal underground scene, and inspired similar records by contemporaries. The band's second album Ride the Lightning extended the limits of the genre with its more sophisticated songwriting and improved production. The album caught the attention of Elektra Records representative Michael Alago, who signed the group to an eight-album deal in the fall of 1984. Elektra reissued Ride the Lightning on November 19, and the band began touring larger venues and festivals throughout 1985. After parting with manager Jon Zazula, Metallica began working with Cliff Burnstein and Peter Mensch of Q Prime. During the summer, the band played the Monsters of Rock festival at Castle Donington, alongside Bon Jovi and Ratt to an audience of 70,000.

Metallica was motivated to make an album that would impress critics and fans, and began writing new material in mid-1985. Lead vocalist and rhythm guitarist James Hetfield and drummer Lars Ulrich were the main songwriters on the album, already titled Master of Puppets. The two developed ideas at a garage in El Cerrito, California, before inviting bassist Cliff Burton and guitarist Kirk Hammett for rehearsals. Hetfield and Ulrich described the songwriting process as starting with "guitar riffs, assembled and reassembled until they start to sound like a song". After that, the band came up with a song title and topic, and Hetfield wrote lyrics to match the title. Master of Puppets is Metallica's first album not to feature songwriting contributions from former lead guitarist Dave Mustaine. Mustaine claimed he had co-written "Leper Messiah", based on an old song called "The Hills Ran Red". The band denied this, but stated that one section incorporated Mustaine's ideas.

When I saw two kids who worked there in London wearing T-shirts of a local San Francisco band, I knew I was onto something. When I heard their record, I knew they were the one band that could sell to both mainstream and underground metal audiences.

— Cliff Burnstein, on signing Metallica

The band was not satisfied with the acoustics of the American studios they considered, and decided to record in Ulrich's native Denmark. Ulrich took drum lessons, and Hammett worked with Joe Satriani to learn how to record more efficiently. Ulrich was in talks with Rush's bassist and vocalist Geddy Lee to produce the album, but the collaboration never materialized because of uncoordinated schedules. Metallica recorded the album with producer Flemming Rasmussen at Sweet Silence Studios in Copenhagen, Denmark, from September 1 to December 27, 1985. The writing of all the songs except "Orion" and "The Thing That Should Not Be" was completed before the band's arrival in Copenhagen. Rasmussen stated that the band brought well-prepared demos of the songs, and only slight changes were made to the compositions in the studio. The recording took longer than the previous album because Metallica had developed a sense of perfectionism and had higher ambitions.

Metallica eschewed the slick production and synthesizers of contemporary hard rock and glam metal albums. With a reputation for drinking, the band stayed sober on recording days. Hammett recalled that the group was "just making another album" at the time and "had no idea that the record would have such a range of influence that it went on to have". He also said that the group was "definitely peaking" at the time and that the album had "the sound of a band really gelling, really learning how to work well together." The band largely recorded their instrumental parts separately, starting the songs with a click track and a guide guitar part from Hetfield.

Rasmussen and Metallica did not manage to complete the mixtapes as planned. Instead, the multitrack recordings were sent in January 1986 to Michael Wagener, who finished the album's mixing. The cover was designed by Metallica and Peter Mensch and painted by Don Brautigam. It depicts a cemetery field of white crosses tethered to strings, manipulated by a pair of hands in a blood-red sky. Ulrich explained that the artwork summarized the lyrical content of the album—people being subconsciously manipulated. The original artwork was sold at Rockefeller Plaza, New York City for $28,000 in 2008 (equivalent to $41,870 in 2025). The band mocked the warning stickers promoted by the PMRC with a facetious Parental Advisory label on the cover: "The only track you probably won't want to play is 'Damage, Inc.' due to multiple use of the infamous 'F' word. Otherwise, there aren't any 'shits', 'fucks', 'pisses', 'cunts', 'motherfuckers', or 'cocksuckers' anywhere on this record".

The album was recorded with the following equipment: Hammett's guitars were a 1974 Gibson Flying V, a Jackson Randy Rhoads, and a Fernandes Stratocaster copy; Hetfield used a Jackson King V played through a Mesa/Boogie Mark IIC+ amplifier modified as a pre-amp; Burton played an Aria Pro II SB1000 through Mesa/Boogie amplifier heads and cabinets; Ulrich played Tama drum equipment, and borrowed a rare Ludwig Black Beauty snare drum from Def Leppard drummer Rick Allen.

== Music and lyrics ==
Master of Puppets features dynamic music and thick arrangements. Metallica delivered a more refined approach and performance compared to the previous two albums, with multilayered songs and technical dexterity. This album and its predecessor Ride the Lightning follow a similar track sequencing: both open with an up-tempo song with an acoustic intro, followed by a lengthy title track, and a fourth track with ballad qualities. Although both albums are similarly structured, the musicianship on Master of Puppets is more powerful and epic in scope, with tight rhythms and delicate guitar solos. According to music writer Joel McIver, Master of Puppets introduced a new level of heaviness and complexity in thrash metal, displaying atmospheric and precisely executed songs. Hetfield's vocals had matured from the hoarse shouting of the first two albums to a deeper, in-control, yet aggressive style.

The songs explore themes such as control and the abuse of power. The lyrics describe the consequences of alienation, oppression, and feelings of powerlessness. Author Ryan Moore thought the lyrics depicted "ominous yet unnamed forces of power wielding total control over helpless human subjects". The lyrics were considered perceptive and harrowing, and were praised for being honest and socially conscious by writer Brock Helander. Referring to the epic proportions of the songs, BBC Music's Eamonn Stack stated that "at this stage in their careers Metallica weren't even doing songs, they were telling stories". The compositions and arrangements benefited from Burton's classical training and understanding of harmony.

"Battery" refers to angry violence, as in the term "assault and battery". Some critics contended that the title actually refers to an artillery battery, and interpreted it as "Hetfield [singing] of a war tactic as the aggressor" personifying destruction. The song begins with bass-heavy classical guitars that build upon multitracked layers until they are joined by a sonic wall of distorted electric guitars. It then breaks into fast, aggressive riffing, featuring off-beat rhythms and heavily distorted minor dyads where root-fifth power chords might be expected. Hetfield improvised the riff while relaxing in London.

"Master of Puppets"
The lyrics on "Master of Puppets" are from the point of a voice of a personification of addiction. Author Mick Wall puts forth manipulation by "the invisible forces of control that govern all our lives" as a theme that runs throughout the album.

"Master of Puppets" consists of several riffs with odd meters and a cleanly picked middle section with melodic solo. The song shares a similar structure with "The Four Horsemen" from the band's first album: two verse-chorus sets lead to a lengthy interlude to another verse-chorus set. The opening and pre-verse sections feature fast downpicked chromatic riffing at around 212 beats per minute in mostly 4/4 time. Every fourth bar of each verse and the outro is cut short by more than a beat; the time signature of these bars is often idealistically analyzed as being 5/8, but it is performed with a delay after the third beat, making it closer to 21/32 (4+4+5+4+4/32). A lengthy interlude follows the second chorus, beginning with a clean, arpeggiated section over which Hetfield contributes a melodic solo; the riffing becomes distorted and progressively more heavy and Hammett provides a more virtuosic solo before the song eventually returns to the main verse. A riff from "Andy Warhol" by David Bowie (at 0:48) is quoted in the track (at 6:19). It is a homage made by Burton and Hammett to whom Bowie was a huge influence. The song closes with a fade-out of sinister laughter. The lyrical theme is cocaine addiction. The song was issued as a single in France.

"The Thing That Should Not Be" was inspired by the Cthulhu Mythos created by famed horror writer H.P. Lovecraft, with notable direct references to The Shadow over Innsmouth and to Cthulhu himself, who is the subject matter of the song's chorus. It is considered the heaviest track on the album, with the main riff emulating a beast dragging itself into the sea. The Black Sabbath-influenced guitars are down-tuned, creating slow and moody ambience.

"Welcome Home (Sanitarium)"
The song's subject matter is madness and serves as a metaphor for honesty and truth. According to philosopher William Irwin, "Welcome Home (Sanitarium)" is perhaps the most revealing of Metallica's songs dealing with insanity.

"Welcome Home (Sanitarium)" was based on Ken Kesey's novel One Flew Over the Cuckoo's Nest and conveys the thoughts of a patient unjustly caged in a mental institution. The song opens with a section of clean single strings and harmonics. The clean, arpeggiated main riff is played in alternating 4/4 and 6/4 time signatures. The song is structured with alternating somber clean guitars in the verses, and distorted heavy riffing in the choruses, unfolding into an aggressive finale. This structure follows a pattern of power ballads Metallica set with "Fade to Black" on Ride the Lightning and would follow with "One" on ...And Justice for All and later "The Day That Never Comes" on Death Magnetic.

"Disposable Heroes" is an anti-war song about a young soldier whose fate is controlled by his superiors. With sections performed at 220 beats per minute, it is one of the most intense tracks on the record. The guitar passage at the end of each verse was Hammett's imitation of the sort of music he found in war films.

The syncopated riffing of "Leper Messiah" challenges the hypocrisy of the televangelism that emerged in the 1980s. The song describes how people are willingly turned into blind religious followers who mindlessly do whatever they are told. The 136 beats per minute mid-tempo riffing of the verses culminates in a descending chromatic riff in the chorus; it increases to a galloping 184 beats per minute for the middle section that climaxes in a distorted scream of "Lie!". The title derives from the lyrics to the David Bowie song "Ziggy Stardust".

"Orion" is a multipart instrumental highlighting Burton's bass playing. It opens with a fade-in bass section, heavily processed to resemble an orchestra. It continues with mid-tempo riffing, followed by a bass riff at half-tempo. The tempo accelerates during the latter part, and ends with music fading out. Burton arranged the middle section, which features its moody bass line and multipart guitar harmonies.

"Damage, Inc." rants about senseless violence and reprisal at an unspecified target. It starts with a series of reversed bass chords based on the chorale prelude of Bach's "Come, Sweet Death". The song then jumps into a rapid rhythm with a pedal-point riff in E that Hammett says was influenced by Deep Purple.

== Release ==
Released on March 3, 1986, the album had a 72-week run on the Billboard 200 album charts and earned the band its first gold certification. The album debuted on March 29 at number 128 and peaked at number 29 on the Billboard 200 chart. Billboard reported that 300,000 copies were sold in its first three weeks. More than 500,000 copies were sold in its first year, even with virtually no radio airplay and no music videos. In 2025, Master of Puppets was certified 8× platinum by the Recording Industry Association of America (RIAA), with eight million copies shipped in the United States. Between the beginning of the Nielsen SoundScan era in 1991 and 2023, 7,980,000 copies were sold. The album was less successful on an international level, despite entering the top 5 on the Finnish and the top 40 on the German and Swiss album charts in its inaugural year. In 2004, it peaked within the Top 15 in Sweden. In 2008, the album reached the top 40 on the Australian and Norwegian album charts. It received 6× platinum certification from Music Canada and a gold certification from the British Phonographic Industry (BPI) for shipments of 600,000 and 100,000 copies, respectively.

== Reception ==
Professional ratings
Review scores
Source	Rating
AllMusic	5/5 stars
Chicago Tribune	4/4 stars
Christgau's Record Guide: The '80s	B−
Collector's Guide to Heavy Metal	10/10
The Encyclopedia of Popular Music	4/5 stars
The Great Rock Discography	9/10
Kerrang!	5/5 stars
MusicHound Rock	4/5 stars
The Rolling Stone Album Guide	5/5 stars

Master of Puppets was hailed as a masterpiece by critics outside of the thrash metal audience and cited by some as the genre's greatest album. In a contemporary review, Tim Holmes of Rolling Stone asserted that the band had redefined heavy metal with the technical skill and subtlety showcased on the album, which he described as "the sound of global paranoia". Kerrang! wrote that Master of Puppets "finally put Metallica into the big leagues where they belong". Editor Tom King said Metallica was at an "incredible song-writing peak" during the recording sessions, partially because Burton contributed to the songwriting. By contrast, Spin's Judge I-Rankin was disappointed with the album and said, although the production is exceptional and Metallica's experimentation is commendable, it eschews the less "intellectual" approach of Kill 'Em All for a MDC-inspired direction that is inconsistent.

In a retrospective review, AllMusic's Steve Huey viewed Master of Puppets as Metallica's best album and remarked that, although it was not as unexpected as Ride the Lightning, it is a more musically and thematically consistent album. Greg Kot of the Chicago Tribune said the songs were the band's most intense at that point, and veer toward "the progressive tendency of Rush." Adrien Begrand of PopMatters praised the production as "a metal version of Phil Spector's Wall of Sound" and believed none of Metallica's subsequent albums could match its passionate and intense musical quality. BBC Music's Eamonn Stack called the album "hard, fast, rock with substance" and likened the songs to stories of "biblical proportions". Canadian journalist Martin Popoff compared the album to Ride the Lightning and found Master of Puppets not a remake, though similar in "awesome power and effect". Robert Christgau was more critical. Writing in Christgau's Record Guide: The '80s (1990), he said the band's energy and political motivations are respectable, but the music evokes clichéd images of "revolutionary heroes" who are "male chauvinists too inexperienced to know better".

Bassist Robert Trujillo cited Master of Puppets as his favorite album, "I feel Master of Puppets has a lot of everything. It's got instrumentals, it's got great segues, great riffs. It's got one of my favorite songs ever by Metallica, and that song is "Disposable Heroes". So any time I can hear that particular song, count me in. "Battery" is an amazing song. So it's just got everything that I love about Metallica."

=== Accolades ===
Master of Puppets has appeared in several publications' best album lists. It was ranked number 167 on Rolling Stone's list of 500 Greatest Albums of All Time, maintaining the rating in a 2012 revised list, and upgrading to number 97 in a 2020 revised list. The magazine would also later rank it second on its 2017 list of "100 Greatest Metal Albums of All Time", behind Black Sabbath's Paranoid. Time included the album in its list of the 100 best albums of all time. According to the magazine's Josh Tyrangiel, Master of Puppets reinforced the velocity of playing in heavy metal and diminished some of its clichés. Slant Magazine placed the album at number 90 on its list of the best albums of the 1980s, saying Master of Puppets is Metallica's best and most sincere recording. The album is featured in Robert Dimery's book 1001 Albums You Must Hear Before You Die. IGN named Master of Puppets the best heavy metal album of all time. The website stated it was Metallica's best because it "built upon and perfected everything they had experimented with prior" and that "all the pieces come together in glorious cohesion". Music journalist Martin Popoff also ranked it the best heavy metal album. Rock Hard ranked the album as the second greatest rock and metal album of all time, behind AC/DC's Back in Black. The album was voted the fourth greatest guitar album of all time by Guitar World in 2006, and the title track ranked number 61 on the magazine's list of the 100 greatest guitar solos. Total Guitar ranked the main riff of the title track at number 7 among the top 20 guitar riffs. The April 2006 edition of Kerrang! was dedicated to the album and included the cover album Master of Puppets: Remastered as a giveaway.

== Legacy ==
Master of Puppets became thrash metal's first platinum album and by the early 1990s thrash metal successfully challenged and redefined the mainstream of heavy metal. Metallica and a few other bands headlined arena concerts and appeared regularly on MTV, although radio play remained incommensurate with their popularity. Master of Puppets is widely accepted as the genre's most accomplished album, and paved the way for subsequent development. The album, in the words of writer Christopher Knowles, "ripped Metallica away from the underground and put them atop the metal mountain". David Hayter from Guitar Planet recognized the album as one of the most influential records ever made and a benchmark by which other metal albums should be judged. MTV's Kyle Anderson had similar thoughts, saying that 25 years after its release the album remained a "stone cold classic". Carlos Ramirez from Noisecreep believes that Master of Puppets stands as one of the most representative albums of its genre.

The year 1986 is seen as a pinnacle year for thrash metal in which the genre broke out of the underground due to albums such as Megadeth's Peace Sells... but Who's Buying? and Slayer's Reign in Blood. Anthrax released Among the Living in 1987, and by the end of the year these bands, alongside Metallica, were being called the "Big Four" of thrash metal. Master of Puppets frequently tops critic and fan polls of favorite thrash metal albums. Histories of the band tend to position Ride the Lightning, Master of Puppets, and ...And Justice for All as a trilogy over the course of which the band's music progressively matured and became more sophisticated. In 2015, the album was deemed "culturally, historically, or aesthetically significant" by the Library of Congress and was selected for preservation in the National Recording Registry.

Kerrang! released a tribute album titled Master of Puppets: Remastered with the April 8, 2006, edition of the magazine to celebrate the 20th anniversary of Master of Puppets. The album featured cover versions of Metallica songs by Machine Head, Bullet for My Valentine, Chimaira, Mastodon, Mendeed, and Trivium—all of which are influenced by Metallica.

The title track was also featured in the fourth season finale of the Netflix series Stranger Things, as the character Eddie Munson plays the song in the Upside Down dimension to draw the dimension's monsters away from his friends. Kelly McClure of Salon compares the song's newfound popularity to Kate Bush's "Running Up That Hill", another song featured in the show's fourth season. The song's appearance on Stranger Things saw the song resurging on Spotify's charts, behind "Running Up That Hill", and the band stated on social media that "It's an incredible honor to be such a big part of Eddie's journey and to once again be keeping company with all of the amazing artists featured in the show."

== Tour and Burton's death ==
Metallica opted for extensive touring instead of releasing a single or video to promote the album. The Damage, Inc. Tour began in March 1986, and the band spent March to August touring as the opening act for Ozzy Osbourne in the United States, the first tour Metallica played to arena-sized audiences. During sound checks, the group played riffs from Osbourne's previous band Black Sabbath, which Osbourne perceived as mockery. Ulrich, however, stated that Metallica was honored to play with Osbourne, who treated the band well on the tour. Metallica was noted by the media for their excessive drinking habit while touring and earned the nickname "Alcoholica". The band members occasionally even wore satirical T-shirts reading "Alcoholica/Drank 'Em All".

The band usually played a 45-minute set often followed by an encore. According to Ulrich, the audiences in bigger cities were already familiar with Metallica's music, unlike in the smaller towns they've visited. "In the B-markets, people really don't know what we're all about. But after 45 or 50 minutes we can tell we've won them over. And fans who come to hear Ozzy go home liking Metallica." Metallica won over Osbourne's fans and slowly began to establish a mainstream following. Hetfield broke his wrist in a mid-tour skateboarding accident, and guitar technician John Marshall played rhythm guitar on several dates.

The European leg of the tour commenced in September, with Anthrax as the supporting band. The morning after a performance on September 26 in Stockholm, the band's bus rolled off the road, and Burton was thrown through a window and killed instantly. The driver claimed he hit a patch of black ice, but others believed he was either drunk or fell asleep at the wheel. The driver was charged with manslaughter but was not convicted. The band returned to San Francisco and hired Flotsam and Jetsam bassist Jason Newsted to replace Burton. Many of the songs that appeared on the band's next album, ...And Justice for All, were composed during Burton's career with the band.

=== Later live performances ===
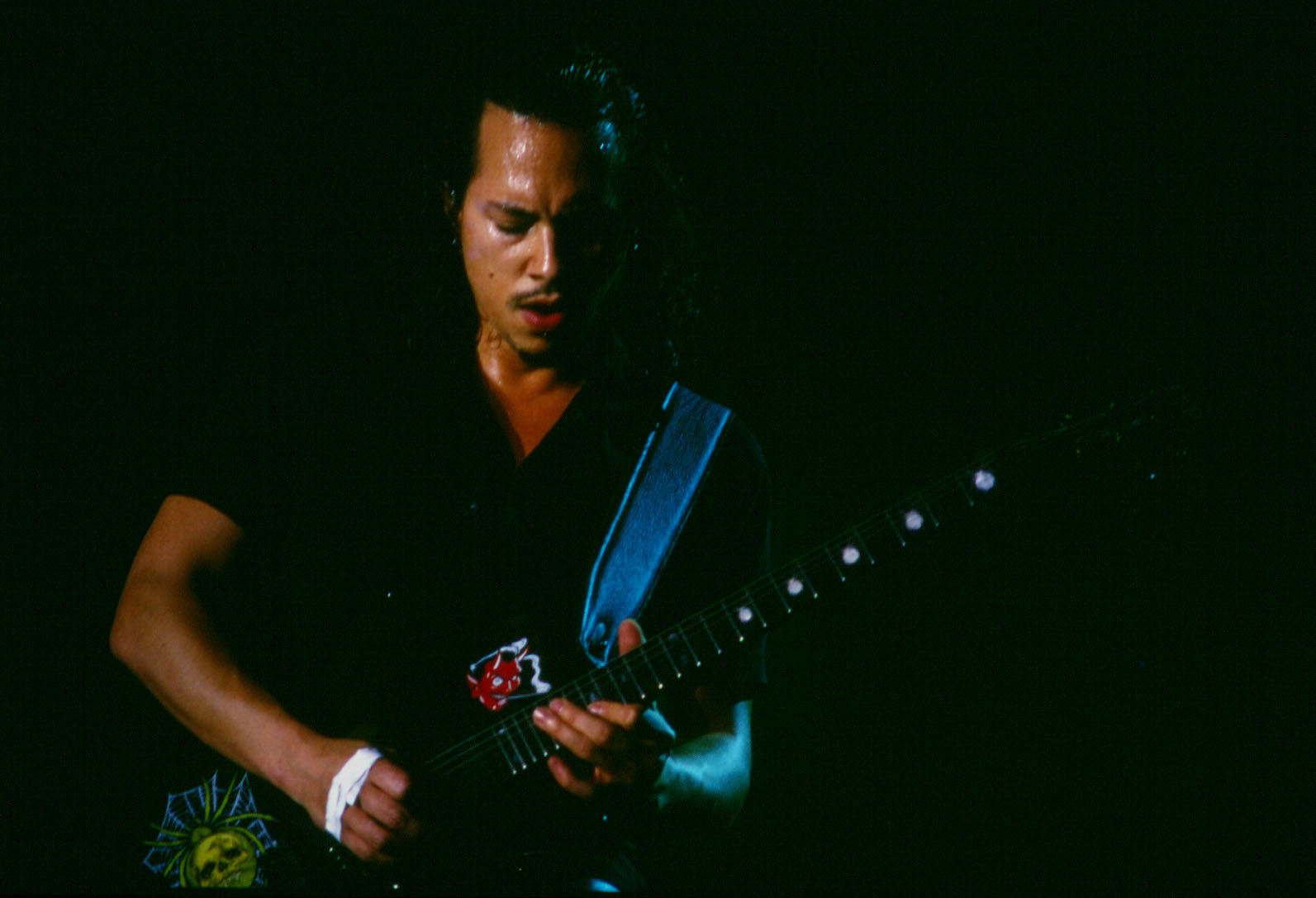
Hammett performing the "Master of Puppets" solo in 1998

All of the songs have been performed live, and some became permanent setlist features. Four tracks were featured on the nine-song set list for the album's promotional tour: "Battery" as opener, "Master of Puppets", "Welcome Home (Sanitarium)", and "Damage, Inc." The title track became a live staple and the most-played Metallica song. Loudwire's Chad Childers characterized the band's performance as "furious" and the song as the set's highlight. Rolling Stone described the live performance as "a classic in all its eight-minute glory". While filming its 3D movie Metallica: Through the Never (2013) at Rogers Arena in Vancouver, crosses were rising from the stage during the song, reminiscent of the album's cover art.

"Welcome Home (Sanitarium)" is the second-most performed song from the album. The live performance is often accompanied by lasers, pyrotechnical effects and film screens. "Battery" is usually played at the beginning of the setlist or during the encore, accompanied by lasers and flame plumes. "Disposable Heroes" is featured in the video album Orgullo, Pasión, y Gloria: Tres Noches en la Ciudad de México (2009) filmed in Mexico City, in which the song was played on the second of three nights at the Foro Sol. "Orion" is the least-performed song from the album. Its first live performance was during the Escape from the Studio '06 tour, when the band performed the album in its entirety, honoring the 20th anniversary of its release. The band performed the album in the middle of the set. "Battery", "Welcome Home (Sanitarium)", "Damage, Inc." and the full-length "Master of Puppets" were revived for the band's concerts in 1997 and 1998, after having been retired for a number of years.

== 2017 deluxe box set ==
Professional ratings
Aggregate scores
Source	Rating
Metacritic	95/100
Review scores
Source	Rating
Classic Rock	5/5 stars
Pitchfork	10/10

In 2017, the album was remastered and reissued in a limited-edition deluxe box set with an expanded track listing and bonus content. The deluxe edition set includes the original album on vinyl and CD, with two additional vinyl records containing a live recording from Chicago; nine CDs of interviews, rough mixes, demo recordings, outtakes, and live recordings recorded from 1985 to 1987; a cassette of a fan recording of Metallica's September 1986 live concert in Stockholm, which was Burton's final performance before his death; and two DVDs of interviews and live recordings recorded in 1986.

The reissue received critical acclaim. Classic Rock magazine's Philip Wilding praised the remastered songs and cited the working mixes and demos as the box set's highlights, writing: "It's a wonderful insight into the machinations of one of the biggest bands in the world, as well as the fallibility that can only be overcome by hard graft and equal amounts of inspiration."

== Track listing ==
All lyrics written by James Hetfield.

Side one
No.	Title	Music	Length
1.	"Battery"	Hetfield; Lars Ulrich	5:13
2.	"Master of Puppets"	Hetfield; Ulrich; Cliff Burton; Kirk Hammett	8:36
3.	"The Thing That Should Not Be"	Hetfield; Ulrich; Hammett	6:37
4.	"Welcome Home (Sanitarium)"	Hetfield; Ulrich; Hammett	6:28

Side two
No.	Title	Music	Length
5.	"Disposable Heroes"	Hetfield; Ulrich; Hammett	8:17
6.	"Leper Messiah"	Hetfield; Ulrich	5:40
7.	"Orion" (instrumental)	Hetfield; Ulrich; Burton	8:28
8.	"Damage, Inc."	Hetfield; Ulrich; Burton; Hammett	5:33
Total length:			54:52

The bonus tracks on the digital re-release were recorded live at the Seattle Coliseum, Seattle, Washington, on August 29 and 30, 1989, and also appeared on the live album Live Shit: Binge & Purge (1993).

Bonus tracks (digital reissue)
No.	Title	Music	Length
9.	"Battery" (Live)	Hetfield; Ulrich	4:53
10.	"The Thing That Should Not Be" (Live)	Hetfield; Ulrich; Hammett	7:02
Total length:			66:42

== Personnel ==
Credits are adapted from the album's liner notes.

Metallica

- James Hetfield – rhythm guitar, vocals, acoustic guitars on "Battery", 1st guitar solo on "Master of Puppets", 2nd guitar solo on "Orion"
- Lars Ulrich – drums, percussion
- Cliff Burton – bass, backing vocals
- Kirk Hammett – lead guitar

Production

- Metallica – production
- Flemming Rasmussen – production, engineering
- Andy Wroblewski – assistant engineer
- Michael Wagener – mixing
- Mark Wilzcak – assistant mixing engineer
- George Marino – mastering, remastering on 1995 re-release
- Howie Weinberg, Gentry Studer – 2017 remastering

Artwork

- Metallica, Peter Mensch – cover concept
- Don Brautigam – cover illustration
- Ross Halfin – inner sleeve photos
- Rich Likong, Ross Halfin, Rob Ellis – back cover photos

Digital reissue bonus tracks

- Jason Newsted – bass and backing vocals
- Mike Gillies – mixing

== Charts ==
=== Weekly charts ===
Weekly chart performance of Master of Puppets
Chart (1986–2024)	Peak position
Australian Albums (ARIA)	33
Austrian Albums (Ö3 Austria)	10
Belgian Albums (Ultratop Flanders)	94
Canadian Albums (Billboard)	28
Canadian Albums (RPM)	52
Dutch Albums (Album Top 100)	17
Finnish Albums (The Official Finnish Charts)	5
French Albums (SNEP)	111
German Albums (Offizielle Top 100)	4
Hungarian Albums (MAHASZ)	24
Irish Albums (IRMA)	42
Italian Albums (FIMI)	65
Japanese Albums (Oricon)	87
New Zealand Albums (RMNZ)	33
Norwegian Albums (VG-lista)	30
Polish Albums (ZPAV)	3
Portuguese Albums (AFP)	8
Scottish Albums (Official Charts)	26
Spanish Albums (Promusicae)	26
Swedish Albums (Sverigetopplistan)	14
Swiss Albums (Schweizer Hitparade)	17
UK Albums (Official Charts)	41
US Billboard 200	29
US Top Rock Albums (Billboard)	7

=== Year-end charts ===
Year-end chart performance of Master of Puppets
Chart (1986)	Position
US Billboard 200	87
Chart (2002)	Position
Canadian Metal Albums (Nielsen SoundScan)	89
Chart (2015)	Position
US Billboard 200	182
US Top Catalog Albums (Billboard)	13
Chart (2016)	Position
US Top Catalog Albums (Billboard)	11
Chart (2018)	Position
US Top Rock Albums (Billboard)	81
Chart (2020)	Position
Polish Albums (ZPAV)	37
Chart (2021)	Position
Polish Albums (ZPAV)	42

== Certifications ==
Region	Certification	Certified units/sales
Argentina (CAPIF)	Platinum	60,000^{^}
Australia (ARIA)	3× Platinum	210,000^{‡}
Belgium (BRMA)	Gold	25,000^{*}
Canada (Music Canada)	6× Platinum	600,000^{^}
Finland (Musiikkituottajat)	Platinum	81,051
Germany (BVMI)	Platinum	500,000^{‡}
Italy (FIMI) sales since 2009	Platinum	50,000^{‡}
New Zealand (RMNZ)	Platinum	15,000^{^}
Poland (ZPAV)	Platinum	20,000^{‡}
United Kingdom (BPI)	Platinum	300,000^{‡}
United States (RIAA)	8× Platinum	8,000,000^{‡} / 7,980,000
^{*} Sales figures based on certification alone.^{^} Shipments figures based on certification alone.^{‡} Sales+streaming figures based on certification alone.
