= Disposable Heroes =

Song by Metallica

from the album Master of Puppets
- Released: March 3, 1986
- Recorded: September–December 1985
- Studio: Sweet Silence, Copenhagen
- Genre: Thrash metal
- Length: 8:16
- Label: New Electric Way; Music for Nations; Elektra
- Composers: James Hetfield; Lars Ulrich; Kirk Hammett
- Lyricist: James Hetfield
- Producers: Metallica; Flemming Rasmussen

"Disposable Heroes" is a song by American heavy metal band Metallica. It is the fifth track on their third studio album, Master of Puppets (1986). The title is taken from the book Fahrenheit 451. Current Metallica bassist Robert Trujillo said "Master of Puppets (has) got one of my favorite songs ever by Metallica, and that song is "Disposable Heroes". So any time I can hear that particular song, count me in."

== Music and lyrics ==
The guitar passage at the end of each verse was Hammett's imitation of the sort of music he found in war films. Drummer Lars Ulrich refers to it as an intense epic, stating, “'Disposable Heroes' is great; it’s seven to eight minutes of very intensive…and you gotta be on your toes when you play it or you’ll miss the next change."

"Disposable Heroes" is an anti-war song about a young soldier whose fate is controlled by his superiors. The lyrics fit well with the album's general theme of feeling helpless and imprisoned, and lack of control over one's own actions. In fact, the album cover, depicting a seemingly endless war cemetery, with each gravestone attached to the hands of the puppet master via a string (reference to title track), with one gravestone featuring a military helmet hanging off of it, and another featuring a dogtag hanging off of it, relates more closely to this song than to any other song from the album. The song also has a double meaning, with Hetfield taking the title and ideas from watching an American Football documentary about injured American Football players.

"Disposable Heroes" was first demoed in mid-1985, months before the recording and subsequent release of the album. In this early rendition, the song doesn't differ much from its final version, the only notable difference being the extra minute of length, due to the presence of another fast riff, which would later be omitted from "Disposable Heroes", to become part of "Damage, Inc.". Some other early versions of the song also featured on the Master of Puppets deluxe boxset.

== Live ==
"Disposable Heroes" was debuted live on September 14, 1985, in St. Goarshausen, Germany, making it the first song from the album to be played live. The song is featured in the video album Orgullo, Pasión, y Gloria: Tres Noches en la Ciudad de México (2009) filmed in Mexico City, in which the song was played on the second of three nights at the Foro Sol. The band played the song during the 2013 Revolver Golden Gods awards ceremony.

"Disposable Heroes" has been played live acoustically a handful of times, all for fundraisers and charity performances. This version of the song features different riffs from the original version, but with the same lyrics. The first two times were for the Bridge School Benefit at the Shoreline Amphitheatre. The band also performed this rendition at the 2018 and 2020 All Within My Hands Foundation "Helping Hands Concert & Auction", with the first being acoustic, and the second being electric. "Here's a heavy song we did acoustic and we're doing it heavy in the acoustic version way," began James Hetfield, who then laughed, "So, I hope you're as confused as we are." Lars Ulrich then quipped, "This is really the fourth dimension, bro. Here we go, check this out."

== Other appearances ==
Disposable Heroes is featured on Guitar Hero: Metallica, alongside 29 other Metallica songs, including 5 other songs from Master of Puppets.

The Swedish extreme metal band Ceremonial Oath recorded a cover for the song on the tribute album Metal Militia: A Tribute to Metallica. The entire Master of Puppets album was covered by Dream Theater as part of its world tour in 2002 and has been released as an official bootleg recording.

== Personnel ==
Credits are adapted from Master of Puppets' liner notes.

Metallica

- James Hetfield – rhythm guitar, vocals
- Lars Ulrich – drums, percussion
- Cliff Burton – bass, backing vocals
- Kirk Hammett – lead guitar

Production

- Metallica – production
- Flemming Rasmussen – production, engineering
- Andy Wroblewski – assistant engineer
- Michael Wagener – mixing
- Mark Wilzcak – assistant mixing engineer
- George Marino – mastering, remastering on 1995 re-release
- Howie Weinberg, Gentry Studer – 2017 remastering
