= Cliff Burnstein =

American music manager and entrepreneur

- Born: Clifford N. Burnstein; July 1948 (age 78); Highland Park, Illinois, U.S.
- Education: University of Pennsylvania (B.A., M.A.)
- Occupations: Music manager; Entrepreneur; Record executive
- Years active: 1973–present
- Organization: Q Prime
- Known for: Co-founder of Q Prime; managing rock bands including Metallica
- Awards: Billboard Power 100 (2012, 2016, 2017, 2018, 2019)
- Website: www.qprime.com

Clifford "Cliff" Burnstein (born July 1948) is an American music manager and entrepreneur. He is the co-founder of Q Prime, a New York-based music management company that has represented rock acts, including Metallica.

Burnstein began his career at Mercury Records, where he signed Rush to their first American record deal. He later worked with Peter Mensch at the management firm Leber-Krebs, which managed AC/DC and other artists, before the two co-founded Q Prime.

== Early life and education ==
Burnstein was born in July 1948, and grew up in the Chicago suburb of Highland Park, Illinois. His father was a tax lawyer, and his grandparents were Jewish immigrants from Eastern Europe. Burnstein's maternal grandparents were garment workers, and his paternal grandfather arrived in the United States "from Russia when he was thirteen or fourteen." Without knowing any English, his grandfather learned how to typeset for Yiddish newspapers, eventually earning enough to relocate to Chicago.

Burnstein attended Highland Park High School, where he competed in debate and found a passion for music. He grew up listening to soul, rock, and blues on AM radio stations from across the country, such as "WBZ from Boston, WLAC from Nashville, KAAY from Little Rock, [and] WABC from New York." In high school, he would send self-addressed envelopes to 20 or more radio stations each week to collect their local surveys, compiling them into his own crudely weighted Top One Hundred national survey. As Burnstein recalled, "'I was obsessed. And it was a tremendous amount of work. But I did this all through high school.'"

Burnstein then attended the University of Pennsylvania, where he earned both a B.A. and M.A. He continued into a PhD program in demography, but pivoted toward looking for jobs in the music business as his scholarship ran out and true love for music came into focus.

== Career ==
=== Mercury Records (1973–1980) ===
After sending out his resume to dozens of music companies, Burnstein received an interview from Mercury Records in Chicago. In 1973, he was hired into the label's finance department by its then-president, Irwin Steinberg.

That same year, Burnstein was promoted to National Album Promotion Director within the label. In this role, Burnstein cold-called every station on the Walrus FM radio tip sheet, a newsletter that tracked the most added and popular records of the previous two weeks. At the time, Burnstein was promoting bands such as Bachman-Turner Overdrive, Thin Lizzy, and the New York Dolls. When he called Brandeis University's WBRS, the program director, Peter Mensch, picked up. The two became fast friends, connecting over their shared music taste.

In June 1974, Burnstein signed Rush to their first American record deal. He had one business day to make the decision after their self-titled debut album, Rush, was submitted to Mercury. Burnstein said that Moon Records, the band's Canadian label, was seeking to export the album after it began to receive traction in Cleveland, Ohio. Burnstein confirmed with Cleveland rock station WMMS that the record was gaining traction and convinced Steinberg to sign the band that same day. Following their signing, Rush began to receive success, eventually becoming Rock and Roll Hall of Fame inductees in 2013.

By 1977, Burnstein had started a punk rock label under Mercury called Blank Records. He hired Peter Mensch as its general manager. The label signed and released the influential debut albums of rock bands Pere Ubu and The Suicide Commandos.

In early 1979, Burnstein—having shifted into A&R at Mercury—pursued German rock band Scorpions for the label. After he learned that Scorpions were no longer with RCA Records in the United States, and their forthcoming album Lovedrive had been passed on by Capitol Records, Burnstein traveled to Bremen, Germany to see them perform. Burnstein was introduced to the band, and expressed his interest in releasing Lovedrive on Mercury in North America, which Burnstein said was "an exceptional album." After signing with Mercury, the band brought on Mensch as their manager—who had just begun managing AC/DC at Leber-Krebs.

During the summer of 1979, Burnstein got hold of a copy of Def Leppard's debut, The Def Leppard E.P. According to Burnstein, he "fell in love with [the EP]." He pledged to "put out their first album simultaneously in the United States and England," as the band had signed with PolyGram (which owned Mercury) for all territories except the United States. In September 1979, Burnstein and Mensch traveled to Wolverhampton, England to see Def Leppard perform. The pair met the band, with Burnstein offering to release their record in America and Mensch offering them management and opening slots on AC/DC's tour the following December. The band agreed, signing a label deal with Mercury for North America and bringing on Mensch at Leber-Krebs for management.

In addition to the aforementioned artists, Burnstein signed Faith Band, Roadmaster, and The Brains during his time at Mercury.

=== Leber-Krebs (1980–1982) ===
In February 1980, Burnstein left Mercury to join Mensch at Leber-Krebs, moving to New York City that same month. He later recalled that he "wanted to be unambiguously on somebody’s side," referring to the artists, or as he put it, "the side of the angels." At Leber-Krebs, the pair managed AC/DC during their successful Back in Black album, which sold over 50 million copies worldwide, making it the best-selling rock album in history. Together, the pair also managed Scorpions, Michael Schenker Group, and Def Leppard. Burnstein and Mensch's work at Leber-Krebs ended in April 1982, at which point they started Q Prime.

=== Q Prime (1982–present) ===
Cliff Burnstein co-founded Q Prime with Peter Mensch on April 1, 1982, launching the management company from their apartments in New York and London. Their first client, Def Leppard, achieved commercial success with their 1983 album Pyromania, which sold over 10 million copies in the U.S. and contributed to Q Prime's early reputation.

Burnstein negotiated Metallica's major label deal with Elektra Records and oversaw the release of Master of Puppets in 1986.

Burnstein and Q Prime have managed artists including Red Hot Chili Peppers, The Smashing Pumpkins, Cage The Elephant, and worked with artists such as The Rolling Stones, Led Zeppelin, and Madonna. Artists managed by Q Prime won Grammy Awards, earned Billboard 200 Top 10 Albums, and include two Rock and Roll Hall of Fame inductees.

== Personal life ==
Burnstein is a longtime baseball fan, particularly of the Chicago White Sox, and has frequently attended spring training games in Florida. He has also expressed a lifelong passion for film.

In 2007, Burnstein made a $1.5 million gift to Yale School of Medicine to support cancer research led by Dr. Jeffrey L. Sklar, a former middle school classmate. Reconnecting decades later, Burnstein said the gift was inspired by trust in Sklar's intellect and integrity: "Jeff’s one of the highest-quality people I ever met in my life, and I’m backing him." The donation supported research that challenged long-held assumptions about how cancer develops at the chromosomal level.
