= Q Prime =

New York-based music management company

Q Prime Inc.
- Type: Private
- Industry: Music industry
- Founded: April 1, 1982
- Founders: Cliff Burnstein, Peter Mensch
- Headquarters: New York City, United States
- Area served: Worldwide
- Number of employees: 40 (as of 2018)
- Divisions: Q Prime; Q Prime UK; Q Prime South; Q Prime AF
- Website: qprime.com

Q Prime Inc. (Q Prime) is an American music management company founded in 1982 by Cliff Burnstein and Peter Mensch. The company represents rock, country, and folk artists including Metallica, Cage The Elephant, Eric Church, and Gillian Welch. It previously managed notable rock and pop acts such as the Red Hot Chili Peppers, Def Leppard, and The Black Keys.

Headquartered in New York City, Q Prime operates four divisions and maintains offices in London, Los Angeles, and Nashville. The company provides full-service, artist-owned labels for several of its artists, alongside digital, radio promotion, marketing, publicity, and touring departments.

== History ==
=== Partnership before founding (pre–1982) ===
Q Prime founders Cliff Burnstein and Peter Mensch first met in 1973, when Burnstein—then working as a Chicago-based radio promoter at Mercury Records—cold-called Mensch, who was the program director at Brandeis University's WBRS radio station. While Burnstein initially reached out to promote artists such as Bachman-Turner Overdrive, Thin Lizzy, and New York Dolls, the conversation shifted to their shared taste in music. Months later, in 1974, a college radio conference brought Burnstein to Boston and the pair met in person for the first time. The two connected over bands like Spooky Tooth, The Move, and Procol Harum.

By 1977, Burnstein had started a punk rock label under Mercury called Blank Records. He hired Mensch as its general manager after Mensch finished his master's in marketing at the University of Chicago. There, the pair signed and worked with Cleveland rock band Pere Ubu. In April 1978, Mensch accepted a position with Aerosmith's management company, Leber-Krebs. Mensch worked as Aerosmith's tour accountant on the Draw the Line Tour, where he first met opening act AC/DC. Shortly after the tour ended in March 1979, Mensch began to manage AC/DC and became a partner at Leber-Krebs.

By this time, Burnstein had shifted from promotion to A&R at Mercury, where he signed Rush to their first American deal. In 1979, Burnstein signed Scorpions and Def Leppard to the label, who both went with Mensch at Leber-Krebs for management. Burnstein recalled finding life at Mercury difficult, as the company did not adequately promote Rush's early albums. Burnstein said of the experience, "When you're at a label, you're torn. You go out and sign a band you think are the greatest, you find a producer and choose the songs, do the sequencing and get the artwork [...] and then the head of marketing says, 'We don't have room to promote that this year.'"

In February 1980, Burnstein left Mercury to join Mensch at Leber-Krebs, later describing his shift to management as choosing the "side of the angels." At Leber-Krebs, the pair managed AC/DC during their successful Back in Black era. The album sold over 50 million copies worldwide, making it the best-selling rock album in history. During this time, the pair also managed Scorpions, Michael Schenker Group, and Def Leppard. Burnstein and Mensch's work at Leber-Krebs ended in early-1982.

=== Founding and early years (1982–1989) ===
Burnstein and Mensch established Q Prime on April 1, 1982, following their departures from Leber-Krebs. The company initially had no other employees, and was run out of Burnstein's apartment in New York and Mensch's apartment in London. Def Leppard was their first client. The band's 1981 album High 'n' Dry saw increased popularity in the United States following regular rotation of its videos on MTV. In 1983, a year after Q Prime was founded, the company achieved its first significant success with Def Leppard's album Pyromania, which sold over 10 million copies in the U.S.

In 1984, Q Prime began managing Metallica. After first hearing about the band, Burnstein and Mensch were at Shades, a hard rock record store in London, when they saw multiple kids wearing Metallica t-shirts. The band were set to release their record Ride the Lightning through indie label Megaforce. After meeting with the band, Q Prime took over their management contract and negotiated a major label deal with Elektra Records. The following year, the band's partnership with Q Prime and Elektra resulted in the album Master of Puppets, widely regarded as one of the most influential metal albums of all time. In 2016, Master of Puppets became the first heavy metal album added to the U.S. Library of Congress.

In 1989, Burnstein and Mensch were hired by The Rolling Stones to consult on the band's Steel Wheels album and tour. As creative consultants, Mensch and Burnstein advised on the order of the album's singles, the live show set list, and various aspects of the record.

=== Roster growth and diversification (1990–1999) ===
By 1994, Q Prime had taken on Veruca Salt, Hole, and Bruce Hornsby as management clients—its first in the alternative rock and adult pop genres. Under Q Prime's guidance, Hole embarked on the Live Through This Tour, with Veruca Salt as support. The tour reached 14 countries and generated over $15 million in ticket sales.

In October 1995, Q Prime began managing The Smashing Pumpkins. The band joined the roster the night before the release of Mellon Collie and the Infinite Sadness. The album debuted at No. 1 on the Billboard 200 list, and received seven Grammy Award nominations, including Album of the Year and Record of the Year. The Smashing Pumpkins and Q Prime parted ways in November 1998.

Between fall 1997 and 1999, Q Prime co-managed Madonna's music career with Caresse Henry. Burnstein and Mensch were hired ahead of Madonna's Ray of Light album. According to Mensch, Q Prime pushed for Madonna to choose "Frozen" over "Ray of Light" as the lead single, a decision she later acknowledged as the right one. The record sold over 15 million copies.

Together with Clive Calder's Jive Records, Q Prime formed a joint venture in April 1998 called Volcano Records after purchasing a 50 percent stake in the company. The label was host to Tool, 311, and "Weird Al" Yankovic. Q Prime sold their share of the company in November 2002.

In fall 1998, Q Prime began managing the Los Angeles-based Red Hot Chili Peppers. Over the course of their more than 20 year management relationship, the band released five studio albums: Californication (1999), By the Way (2002), Stadium Arcadium (2006), I'm with You (2011), and The Getaway (2016). These albums earned the band a combined eight Grammy Award nominations and two wins, including Best Rock Album for Stadium Arcadium. In 2012, the Red Hot Chili Peppers were inducted into the Rock and Roll Hall of Fame by Chris Rock. In 2019, the band performed in front of Egypt's pyramids of Giza to more than 10,000 attendees, with more watching via live stream.

=== Expansion to Q Prime South and UK (2000–2009) ===
Q Prime's first expansion came in 2001, when it launched Q Prime South with Nickel Creek manager John Peets. Based in Nashville, Q Prime South manages artists such as Eric Church, Brothers Osborne, and Ashley McBryde.

In 2002, Q Prime began managing Shania Twain ahead of her Up! album. Twain performed at the 2003 Super Bowl halftime show. On September 23, 2004, the album was certified 11-times platinum.

By 2007, both Q Prime South and Q Prime had expanded their rosters further. Q Prime South added Eric Church in 2005 and The Black Keys in 2006, while Q Prime added Silversun Pickups in 2006 and Snow Patrol and Three Days Grace in 2007. In June 2025, Three Days Grace became the second Canadian band to have a song surpass one billion streams on Spotify, with their 2003 single "I Hate Everything About You."

In 2007, Q Prime began managing Jimmy Page and his involvement in Led Zeppelin. The company renegotiated Zeppelin's deal with Warner Music Group, allowing for the release of the band's Mothership greatest hits album in November 2007. One month after the record's release, Q Prime coordinated the Ahmet Ertegun Tribute Concert at London's O2 Arena on December 10, 2007. The show, headlined by Led Zeppelin, was the band's first public appearance in 17 years. Mensch called the show Q Prime's "piece de resistance." It was recorded and released as the film Celebration Day, which came out in 2012 alongside box sets developed by Burnstein and Mensch.

The company's second expansion came in 2007 with the addition of London-based Q Prime UK, which as of June 2025 is run in partnership with manager Steve Matthews. The division manages artists such as Declan McKenna and The Last Dinner Party.

Q Prime began managing long-term client Cage The Elephant in 2008. While the band first released their self-titled debut album on UK-based Relentless Records, Q Prime arranged for the album's re-release in the United States in March 2009 through RCA/Jive Label Group. Under Q Prime, the band has won the Grammy Award for Best Rock Album twice: in 2017 for Tell Me I'm Pretty and in 2020 for Social Cues. In 2024, the band released their album Neon Pill, which was nominated for Best Alternative Music Performance at the 2025 Grammys.

=== New signings and catalog control (2010–2019) ===
Q Prime began managing British band Foals in 2010, coinciding with the release of their Mercury Prize-nominated record, Total Life Forever.

In November 2012, Q Prime negotiated with Elektra Records to enable Metallica to buy back their catalog, gaining control of their masters. Metallica subsequently rereleased their catalog through Q Prime-backed label, Blackened Recordings, distributing their music via Warner's Rhino Entertainment in North America and Universal Music Group internationally.

In 2015, Q Prime began managing Declan McKenna following his win in the Glastonbury Festival Emerging Talent competition. According to Burnstein, McKenna's song "Brazil" had hooked him "from the intro."

In 2017, Q Prime began managing Disturbed. Since then, the band has released two studio albums and had its highest-grossing touring year of its career in 2023, with the Take Back Your Life Tour selling 336,000 tickets and earning $17.4 million.

=== Recent history (2020–present) ===
Q Prime began managing British baroque pop band The Last Dinner Party in Spring 2022, soon after the band's first show. By May 2022, the band had signed a deal with Island Records. In 2024, the band won the BRITs Rising Star award, as well as BBC Radio 1's Sound of 2024. The following year, The Last Dinner Party earned Best New Artist at the 2025 BRITs.

In July 2022, Q Prime client Metallica's 1986 song "Master of Puppets" made a prominent appearance in the season 4 finale of Stranger Things. The episode was credited with introducing Metallica to Gen-Z audiences, and following its airing, the song saw an over 650 percent increase in streams. In March of the following year, Q Prime arranged the deal in which Metallica purchased the Furnace Record Pressing Plant in Alexandria, Virginia.

In May 2023, Q Prime launched a new division, Q Prime AF, in partnership with manager Aaron Frank. Based in Nashville, Frank brought his roster of artists with him, which included Greta Van Fleet and St. Paul and the Broken Bones.

Q Prime added Dogstar to their roster in late 2023. Under Q Prime, the band released Somewhere Between the Power Lines and Palm Trees, their first album in two decades. In September 2024, Q Prime client Cage The Elephant was announced as the supporting act for Oasis on all North American dates of their 2025 reunion tour.

In October 2024, Q Prime began providing label services and distribution for Rock & Roll Hall of Fame inductees The Zombies. Under the partnership, Q Prime manages marketing, manufacturing, distribution, and licensing for The Zombies' Beechwood Park Records label imprint. The imprint plans to reissue remastered versions of the band's 1960s catalog. Of the partnership, Burnstein said that the deal is "all about" the "very narrow window in a Venn diagram where love, admiration and business overlap."

== Roster ==
=== Current artists ===
As of June 2025, the following artists are listed on Q Prime's official website:

Q Prime (New York)

- Annie DiRusso
- Asinhell
- Cage The Elephant
- David Rawlings
- Disturbed
- Dogstar
- Gillian Welch
- Lydia Night
- Metallica
- Pantera
- Silversun Pickups
- Three Days Grace
- Volbeat

Q Prime UK

- Declan McKenna
- Foals
- The Last Dinner Party
- Nell Mescal
- Yannis & The Yaw

Q Prime South

- Ashley McBryde
- Brett Eldredge
- Brothers Osborne
- Eric Church
- Harper O’Neill
- Marty Stuart

Q Prime AF

- All Them Witches
- Dashboard Confessional
- Greta Van Fleet
- Jesse Welles (co-managed with Beau Boggs)
- Matt Maeson
- Richy Mitch & The Coal Miners (co-managed with Beau Boggs)
- St. Paul & The Broken Bones

=== Former artists ===
- The Arcs
- Baroness
- Bruce Hornsby
- Cameo
- Def Leppard
- Dokken
- Fountains of Wayne
- Garbage
- Hole
- Jimmy Page
- Josh Groban
- Journey
- Led Zeppelin (For reunion show)
- Madonna
- Muse
- Nickel Creek
- Queensrÿche
- Red Hot Chili Peppers
- Screaming Trees
- Shania Twain
- Smashing Pumpkins
- Snow Patrol
- Stone Temple Pilots
- Suicidal Tendencies
- Tesla
- The Black Keys
- Veruca Salt
