= Dörarp =

Small locality in Ljungby Municipality, Sweden

Coordinates: 56°59′09″N 14°00′08″E

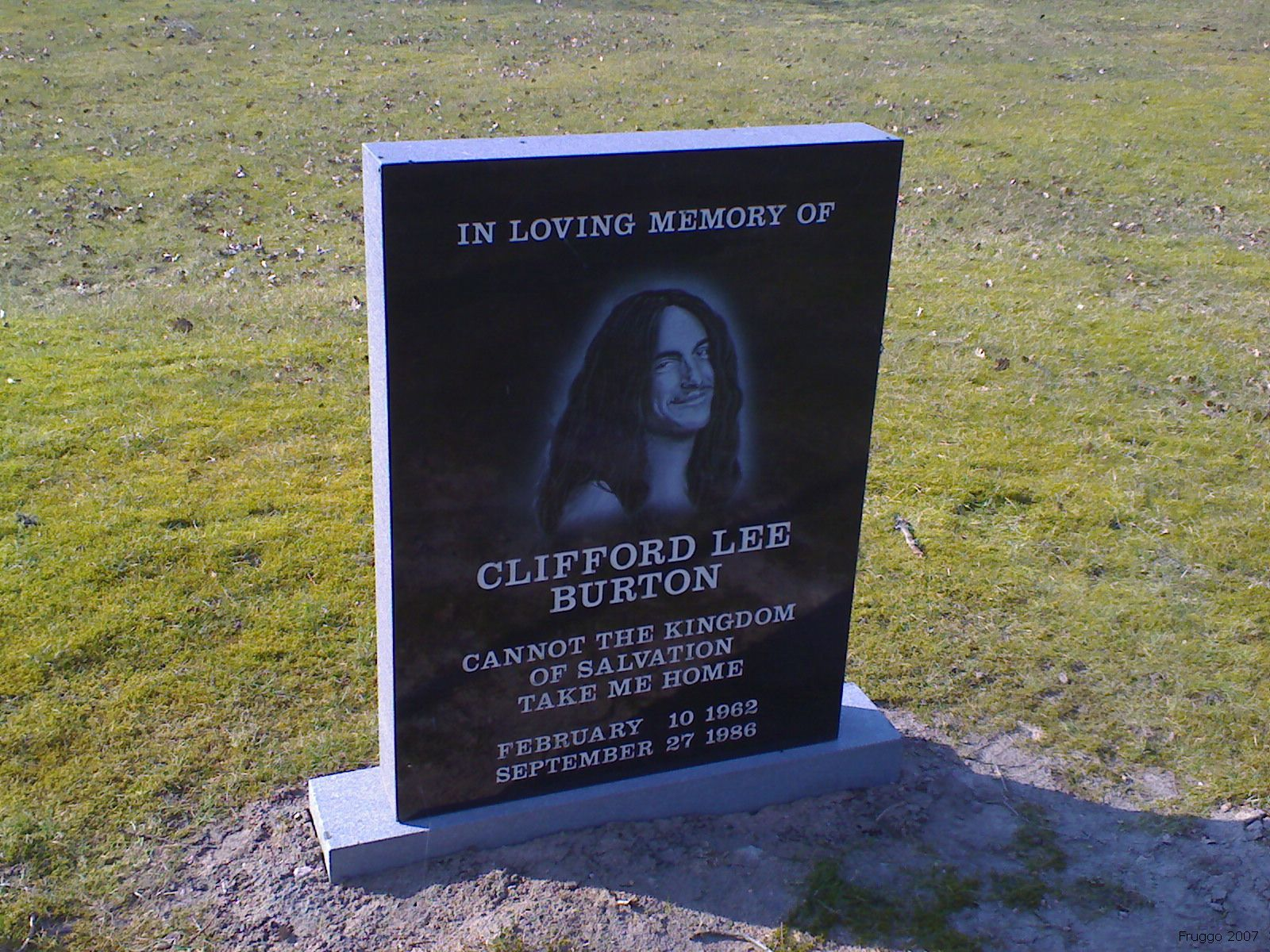
Memorial stone of Cliff Burton, near the site of the bus crash in Dörarp.

Dörarp is a small locality (according to the definition of Statistics Sweden) in Ljungby Municipality, Sweden. In 2005, Dörarp had 145 inhabitants.

Dörarp is also the site of heavy metal band Metallica's tour bus accident during the Damage, Inc. Tour on September 27, 1986. Vocalist James Hetfield, guitarist Kirk Hammett and drummer Lars Ulrich survived with minor injuries, but bassist Cliff Burton was pinned under the bus and pronounced dead. The site of the crash has been marked with Burton's commemorative memorial stone. On May 13, 2022, the bus stop located near the memorial stone changed its name from "Dörarp norra"(Dörarp North) to "Cliff Burton's memorial stone".

The nearest neighboring village is the town Vittaryd, which is 3–4 kilometers away.
