= Damage, Inc. Tour =

1986–1987 concert tour by Metallica

- Promotional tour by Metallica
- Tour poster
- Location: Asia; Europe; North America
- Associated album: Master of Puppets
- Start date: March 27, 1986
- End date: February 13, 1987
- Legs: 9
- No. of shows: 144

Metallica concert chronology
- Ride the Lightning Tour (1984–1985); Damage Inc. Tour (1986–1987); Monsters of Rock '87 (1987)

The Damage, Inc. Tour was a concert tour by the American heavy metal band Metallica in support of the band's third studio album, Master of Puppets. The name of the tour is taken from the last song on the album. It began on March 27, 1986, and ended on February 13, 1987. This was Metallica's last tour with bassist Cliff Burton, who died in the middle of its European leg on September 27, 1986, and he would be replaced by Jason Newsted for the remainder of the tour.

== Background ==
Metallica supported Ozzy Osbourne from March to August, headlined a string of U.S. dates between May 23 and June 7 with Armored Saint, and were the main act throughout the fall and winter with support from Anthrax and Metal Church. Roadie John Marshall, who later played guitar in Metal Church, filled in for James Hetfield on rhythm guitar between July 27 and September 25 following a mid-tour skateboarding accident resulting in a broken arm. Hetfield, Cliff Burton and Kirk Hammett had discussed firing Lars Ulrich upon completion of the tour, but plans were set aside upon the death of Burton on September 27, 1986, in a tour bus accident near Ljungby, Sweden, while en route from Stockholm to Copenhagen, Denmark. Performances that were scheduled for October were postponed and the band hired a new bassist, Jason Newsted, to complete the rest of the tour on October 28, 1986. Metallica also became the first band of the Big Four to cross the Iron Curtain, with two concerts in Katowice, Poland, on February 10 and 11, 1987.

== Tour dates ==
List of 1986 concerts
Date	City	Country	Venue
March 27, 1986	Valley Center	United States	Britt Brown Arena
March 29, 1986	Oklahoma City	United States	Oklahoma State Fair Arena
April 1, 1986	Kansas City	United States	Kemper Arena
April 2, 1986	St. Louis	United States	Kiel Auditorium
April 4, 1986	Detroit	United States	Joe Louis Arena
April 5, 1986	Chicago	United States	UIC Pavilion
April 6, 1986	Milwaukee	United States	MECCA Arena
April 8, 1986	Indianapolis	United States	Market Square Arena
April 9, 1986	Richfield	United States	Richfield Coliseum
April 10, 1986	Erie	United States	Erie Civic Arena
April 12, 1986	Johnstown	United States	Cambria County War Memorial Arena
April 13, 1986	Syracuse	United States	Onondaga County War Memorial Arena
April 14, 1986	Rochester	United States	Rochester Community War Memorial Arena
April 16, 1986	Landover	United States	Capital Centre
April 17, 1986	Binghamton	United States	Broome County Veterans Memorial Arena
April 18, 1986	Bethlehem	United States	Stabler Arena
April 20, 1986	Philadelphia	United States	The Spectrum
April 21, 1986	East Rutherford	United States	Meadowlands Arena
April 23, 1986	Providence	United States	Providence Civic Arena
April 24, 1986	New Haven	United States	New Haven Coliseum
April 25, 1986	Worcester	United States	Centrum in Worcester
April 27, 1986	Glens Falls	United States	Glens Falls Civic Arena
April 28, 1986	Hempstead	United States	Nassau Coliseum
~~April 30, 1986~~	~~Hampton~~	United States	~~Hampton Coliseum~~
May 1, 1986	Richmond	United States	Richmond Coliseum
May 2, 1986	Charlotte	United States	Charlotte Coliseum
May 3, 1986	Johnson City	United States	Freedom Hall
May 4, 1986	Memphis	United States	Mid-South Coliseum
May 6, 1986	New Orleans	United States	Lakefront Arena
May 8, 1986	Austin	United States	Frank Erwin Center
May 9, 1986	Houston	United States	The Summit
May 10, 1986	Fort Worth	United States	Tarrant County Convention Center Arena
May 12, 1986	El Paso	United States	El Paso County Coliseum
May 13, 1986	Albuquerque	United States	Tingley Coliseum
May 15, 1986	Denver	United States	McNichols Sports Arena
May 17, 1986	Salt Lake City	United States	Salt Palace
May 19, 1986	Tucson	United States	Tucson Community Center Arena
May 20, 1986	Phoenix	United States	Arizona Veterans Memorial Coliseum
May 23, 1986	Tulsa	United States	Cain's Ballroom
May 24, 1986	Cape Girardeau	United States	Cape Girardeau Arena
May 25, 1986	Chicago	United States	Aragon Ballroom
May 26, 1986	Des Moines	United States	Iowa State Fairgrounds Grandstand (Iowa Jam 1986)
May 28, 1986	Minneapolis	United States	Orpheum Theatre
May 29, 1986	Eau Claire	United States	Old Mill Expo Center
May 30, 1986	Davenport	United States	The Col Ballroom
May 31, 1986	Decatur	United States	Decatur Civic Center Arena
June 1, 1986	Omaha	United States	Peony Park Ballroom
June 3, 1986	Dallas	United States	Bronco Bowl Auditorium
June 4, 1986	Corpus Christi	United States	Memorial Coliseum
June 5, 1986	McAllen	United States	La Villa Real Convention Center
June 6, 1986	San Antonio	United States	Majestic Theatre
June 7, 1986	Odessa	United States	Ector County Coliseum
June 10, 1986	San Diego	United States	San Diego Sports Arena
June 11, 1986	Las Vegas	United States	Thomas & Mack Center
June 13, 1986	Long Beach	United States	Long Beach Arena
June 14, 1986	Long Beach	United States	Long Beach Arena
June 15, 1986	Long Beach	United States	Long Beach Arena
~~June 16, 1986~~	Daly City	United States	Cow Palace Arena
June 17, 1986	Daly City	United States	Cow Palace Arena
~~June 18, 1986~~	~~Sacramento~~	United States	~~Cal Expo Amphitheatre~~
~~June 20, 1986~~	~~Central Point~~	United States	~~Jackson County Expo Pavilion~~
June 21, 1986	Berkeley	United States	Ruthie's Inn (Billed as "Spastik Children")
June 21, 1986	~~Seattle~~	United States	~~Seattle Coliseum~~
~~June 22, 1986~~	~~Seattle~~	United States	~~Seattle Coliseum~~
~~June 24, 1986~~	~~Spokane~~	United States	~~Spokane Coliseum~~
~~June 25, 1986~~	~~Portland~~	United States	~~Veterans Memorial Coliseum~~
~~June 27, 1986~~	~~Vancouver~~	~~Canada~~	~~Pacific Coliseum~~
~~June 29, 1986~~	~~Calgary~~	~~Canada~~	~~Saddledome~~
~~June 30, 1986~~	~~Edmonton~~	~~Canada~~	~~Northlands Coliseum~~
July 5, 1986	Pihtipudas	Finland	Cape Harju (Saapasjalkarock 1986)
July 6, 1986	Roskilde	Denmark	Roskilde Festival Site (Roskilde Festival)
July 11, 1986	Ashwaubenon	United States	Brown County Veterans Memorial Arena
July 12, 1986	East Troy	United States	Alpine Valley Music Theatre
July 13, 1986	Hoffman Estates	United States	Poplar Creek Music Theater
July 15, 1986	Peoria	United States	Peoria Civic Arena
July 16, 1986	Fort Wayne	United States	Allen County War Memorial Coliseum
July 17, 1986	Columbus	United States	Ohio Center
July 19, 1986	Battle Creek	United States	Kellogg Arena
July 20, 1986	Saginaw	United States	Wendler Arena
July 21, 1986	Clarkston	United States	Pine Knob Music Theatre
July 24, 1986	Cincinnati	United States	Riverbend Music Center
July 25, 1986	Louisville	United States	Cardinal Stadium
~~July 26, 1986~~	~~Evansville~~	United States	~~Mesker Music Theatre~~ (Cancelled after James Hetfield broke his arm in a skateboarding accident)
July 27, 1986	Nashville	United States	Nashville Municipal Auditorium
July 29, 1986	Chattanooga	United States	UTC Arena
July 30, 1986	Knoxville	United States	Knoxville Civic Coliseum
August 1, 1986	Charleston	United States	Charleston Civic Coliseum
August 2, 1986	Columbia	United States	Merriweather Post Pavilion
August 3, 1986	Hampton	United States	Hampton Coliseum
~~August 6, 1986~~	~~Cheektowaga~~	United States	~~September's Cafe~~
~~August 8, 1986~~	~~Toronto~~	~~Canada~~	~~Toronto Concert Hall~~
~~August 12, 1986~~	~~Chicoutimi~~	~~Canada~~	~~Georges-Vezina Centre~~
~~August 19, 1986~~	~~Poughkeepsie~~	~~United States~~	~~Mid-Hudson Civic Center (Mair Hall)~~
~~August 20, 1986~~	~~New York City~~	~~United States~~	~~The Felt Forum~~
September 10, 1986	Cardiff	Wales	St David's Hall
September 11, 1986	Bradford	England	St George's Hall
September 12, 1986	Edinburgh	Scotland	Edinburgh Playhouse Theatre
September 14, 1986	Dublin	Ireland	SFX Concert Hall
September 15, 1986	Belfast	Northern Ireland	Ulster Hall
September 17, 1986	Manchester	England	Manchester Apollo Theatre
September 18, 1986	Sheffield	England	Sheffield City Hall (Ovall Hall)
September 19, 1986	Newcastle	England	Mayfair Ballroom
September 20, 1986	Birmingham	England	Birmingham Odeon Theatre
September 21, 1986	London	England	Hammersmith Odeon Theatre
September 24, 1986	Lund	Sweden	Olympen
September 25, 1986	Lillestrøm	Norway	Skedsmohallen
September 26, 1986	Stockholm	Sweden	Solnahallen
~~September 27, 1986~~	~~Copenhagen~~	~~Denmark~~	~~Saga Rock Theatre~~
~~September 29, 1986~~	~~Hamburg~~	~~West Germany~~	~~Hamburg Market Hall (Auditorium)~~
~~September 30, 1986~~	~~Osnabrück~~	~~West Germany~~	~~Gartlage Hall~~
~~October 1, 1986~~	~~Saarbrücken or West Berlin ?~~	~~West Germany~~	~~Saarlandhalle or Metropolis Theatre ?~~
~~October 3, 1986~~	~~Strasbourg~~	~~France~~	~~Tivoli Hall~~
~~October 4, 1986~~	~~Clermont-Ferrand~~	~~France~~	~~Clermont-Ferrand Sports Hall~~
~~October 6, 1986~~	~~Paris~~	~~France~~	~~Zenith~~
~~October 7, 1986~~	~~Lyon~~	~~France~~	~~Labor Exchange Theatre~~
~~October 8, 1986~~	~~Barcelona~~	~~Spain~~	~~Barcelona Sports Palace~~
~~October 9, 1986~~	~~Madrid~~	~~Spain~~	~~Madrid Sports Pavilion~~
~~October 11, 1986~~	~~Toulouse~~	~~France~~	~~Grains Market Hall~~
~~October 12, 1986~~	~~Marseille~~	~~France~~	~~Bonneveine Beach~~
~~October 13, 1986~~	~~Nice~~	~~France~~	~~Verdure Theatre~~
~~October 14, 1986~~	~~Milan~~	~~Italy~~	~~Trussardi Palace~~
~~October 15, 1986~~	~~Bologna~~	~~Italy~~	~~?~~
~~October 17, 1986~~	~~Sindelfingen~~	~~West Germany~~	~~Messehalle~~
~~October 18, 1986~~	~~Greifensee~~	~~Switzerland~~	~~Greifensee Sports Centrum~~
~~October 19, 1986~~	~~Neunkirchen~~	~~West Germany~~	~~Hemmerlein Hall~~
~~October 20, 1986~~	~~Munich~~	~~West Germany~~	~~Circus Krone Building~~
~~October 21, 1986~~	~~Offenbach~~	~~West Germany~~	~~Offenbach City Hall~~
~~October 23, 1986~~	~~Mannheim~~	~~West Germany~~	~~Mannheimer Rosengarten~~
~~October 24, 1986~~	~~Düsseldorf~~	~~West Germany~~	~~Philips Hall~~
~~October 25, 1986~~	~~Genk~~	~~Belgium~~	~~Limburg Hall~~
~~October 26, 1986~~	~~Zwolle~~	~~Netherlands~~	~~Zwolle Ice Hall ("Aardschok Festival")~~
~~October 30, 1986~~	~~New York City~~	~~United States~~	~~Felt Forum~~
~~November 1, 1986~~	~~Chicoutimi~~	~~Canada~~	~~Georges-Vezina Centre~~
~~November 2, 1986~~	~~Rimouski~~	~~Canada~~	~~Rimouski Coliseum~~
~~November 3, 1986~~	~~Victoriaville~~	~~Canada~~	~~Bois-Francs Coliseum~~
~~November 5, 1986~~	~~Quebec City~~	~~Canada~~	~~Jeunesse Pavilion~~
~~November 6, 1986~~	~~Montreal~~	~~Canada~~	~~Verdun Auditorium~~
~~November 7, 1986~~	~~Toronto~~	~~Canada~~	~~Maple Leaf Gardens~~
~~November 8, 1986~~	~~Cheektowaga~~	United States	~~September's Cafe~~
November 8, 1986	Reseda	United States	Reseda Country Club
~~November 9, 1986~~	~~Hartford~~	United States	~~Agora~~
November 9, 1986	Anaheim	United States	Jezebel's
~~November 10, 1986~~	~~Poughkeepsie~~	United States	~~Mid-Hudson Civic Center (Mair Hall)~~
~~November 12, 1986~~	~~Passaic~~	United States	~~Capitol Theater~~
November 15, 1986	Tokyo	Japan	Shibuya Public Hall
November 17, 1986	Nagoya	Japan	Nitori Culture Hall
November 18, 1986	Osaka	Japan	Festival Hall
November 19, 1986	Tokyo	Japan	Nakano Sun Plaza Hall
November 20, 1986	Tokyo	Japan	Nakano Sun Plaza Hall
~~November 25, 1986~~	~~Melbourne~~	~~Australia~~	~~Palais Theater~~
~~November 27, 1986~~	~~Sydney~~	~~Australia~~	~~Selina's~~
November 26, 1986	Providence	United States	Veterans Memorial Auditorium
November 28, 1986	Poughkeepsie	United States	Mid-Hudson Civic Center (Mair Hall)
November 29, 1986	Passaic	United States	Capitol Theatre
November 30, 1986	West Hartford	United States	Agora Ballroom
December 1, 1986	New York City	United States	Felt Forum
December 3, 1986	Montreal	Canada	Verdun Auditorium
December 4, 1986	Chicoutimi	Canada	Centre Georges-Vézina
December 5, 1986	Quebec City	Canada	Pavillon de la Jeunesse
December 6, 1986	Rimouski	Canada	Colisée de Rimouski
December 7, 1986	Victoriaville	Canada	Colisée Desjardins
December 9, 1986	Toronto	Canada	Maple Leaf Gardens
December 10, 1986	Sudbury	Canada	Sudbury Community Arena
December 13, 1986	Winnipeg	Canada	Pantages Playhouse Theatre
December 14, 1986	~~Regina~~	Canada	~~Saskatchewan Arts Centre (Bell Theatre)~~
December 14, 1986	Brandon	Canada	Keystone Arena
December 15, 1986	Saskatoon	Canada	Saskatoon Arena
December 16, 1986	Edmonton	Canada	Edmonton Convention Centre
December 17, 1986	Calgary	Canada	Max Bell Arena
December 19, 1986	Vancouver	Canada	Pacific Coliseum
December 20, 1986	Seattle	United States	Seattle Arena

List of 1987 concerts
Date	City	Country	Venue
January 8, 1987	Copenhagen	Denmark	Falconer Theatre
January 9, 1987	Holstebro	Denmark	Holstebro Hall
~~January 10, 1987~~	~~Gothenburg~~	~~Sweden~~	~~Lisebergshallen~~
January 12, 1987	Osnabrück	West Germany	Gartlage Hall
January 14, 1987	Lyon	France	Labor Exchange Theatre
January 16, 1987	Bordeaux	France	Bordeaux Celebration Hall
January 17, 1987	Barcelona	Spain	Palau dels Esports de Barcelona
January 18, 1987	Madrid	Spain	Raimundo Saporta Pavilion
January 20, 1987	Nice	France	Théâtre de verdure de Nice
January 21, 1987	Milan	Italy	Palatrussardi
January 23, 1987	Munich	West Germany	Deutsches Museum (Congress Hall)
January 24, 1987	Böblingen	West Germany	Sporthalle
January 25, 1987	Essen	West Germany	Grugahalle
January 27, 1987	Hamburg	West Germany	Markthalle Hamburg (Auditorium)
January 28, 1987	Hamburg	West Germany	Markthalle Hamburg (Auditorium)
January 29, 1987	Offenbach	West Germany	Stadthalle Offenbach
January 30, 1987	Ludwigshafen	West Germany	Friedrich-Ebert-Halle
January 31, 1987	Neunkirchen	West Germany	Hemmerleinhalle
February 1, 1987	Greifensee	Switzerland	Greifensee Sports Centrum
February 3, 1987	Strasbourg	France	Tivoli Hall
February 4, 1987	Clermont-Ferrand	France	Maison du Peuple
February 5, 1987	Paris	France	Le Zénith
February 7, 1987	Brussels	Belgium	Forest National Arena
February 8, 1987	Zwolle	Netherlands	IJsselhallen (Aardschok Festival)
February 10, 1987	Katowice	Poland	Spodek
February 11, 1987	Katowice	Poland	Spodek
February 13, 1987	Gothenburg	Sweden	Frölundaborg

== Personnel ==
March – September 1986:

- James Hetfield – lead vocals, rhythm guitar
- Lars Ulrich – drums
- Cliff Burton – bass, backing vocals
- Kirk Hammett – lead guitar, backing vocals
- John Marshall – rhythm guitar (July 27 – September 25)

November 1986 – February 1987:

- James Hetfield – lead vocals, rhythm guitar
- Lars Ulrich – drums
- Kirk Hammett – lead guitar, backing vocals
- Jason Newsted – bass, backing vocals
