= Saga Cinema =

Saga Cinema was a theatre located in Copenhagen, Denmark. It opened in 1941 and had a seating capacity of 2,086, which at the time was the third largest cinema in Northern Europe. Due to the decline in cinema the theatre was used as a concert venue from the early-1980s until its closing in 1992. The building was subsequently demolished in 1997.
