= Théâtre de Verdure de Nice =

Outdoor theater located in Nice, France

Coordinates: 43.6957°N 7.2678°E

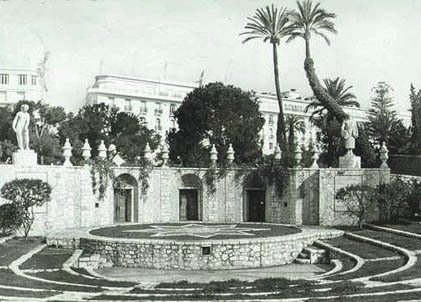
Théâtre de Verdure de Nice in 1947

The Théâtre de Verdure de Nice (French pronunciation: [teɑtʁ də vɛʁdyʁ də nis]) is an outdoor theater located in Nice, France, which was built in 1946 by architect François Aragon. It has a capacity of 1,850 seated or 3,200 standing. Notable artists that have performed at the venue include Dalida, A-ha, Prince & the Revolution, R.E.M., Iron Maiden, Santana, Metallica, Joe Satriani, AC/DC, Elton John, Frank Zappa and Judas Priest.
