= Cliff Burton =

American bassist (1962–1986)

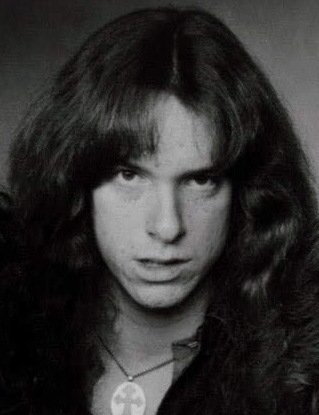
- Burton in 1983

Background information
- Born: Clifford Lee Burton; February 10, 1962; Castro Valley, California, U.S.
- Died: September 27, 1986 (aged 24) Near Dörarp, Sweden
- Genres: Thrash metal; heavy metal
- Occupation: Musician
- Instrument: Bass guitar
- Years active: 1975–1986
- Formerly of: Metallica; Trauma

Clifford Lee Burton (February 10, 1962 – September 27, 1986) was an American musician who was the bassist for the thrash metal band Metallica from 1982 until his death in 1986. He is renowned for his musicianship and influence.

Burton's early musical ventures include performing in bands such as EZ-Street and Agents of Misfortune, and frequently collaborating with guitarist Jim Martin. While performing in Los Angeles with Trauma, he was discovered by James Hetfield and Lars Ulrich who asked him to replace bassist Ron McGovney in Metallica. After the release of the band's first two albums, Kill 'Em All (1983) and Ride the Lightning (1984), Burton and Metallica achieved a worldwide breakthrough with Master of Puppets (1986), often cited as both the band's best work and one of the best metal albums of all time.

While touring in 1986 to support Master of Puppets, Burton was killed when the band's tour bus was involved in an crash. He received a posthumous writing credit on ...And Justice for All (1988) for the song "To Live Is to Die". Burton also appeared in a 2011 Rolling Stone readers' poll recognizing the greatest bassists of all time, and in Rolling Stone's list of the 50 greatest bass players of all time. He was posthumously inducted to the Rock and Roll Hall of Fame as a member of Metallica in 2009.

== Early life ==
Burton was born in Castro Valley, California, to Raymond "Ray" (1925–2020) and Janette "Jan" Burton (1925–1993). He had two older siblings, Scott (1958–1975) and Connie (1956–2026). Burton's interest in music began when his father introduced him to classical music and he began taking piano lessons.

In his teenage years, Burton developed an interest in rock, classical, country, and eventually heavy metal. He began playing the bass at 13, after his brother died from a brain aneurysm. His parents quoted him as saying, "I'm going to be the best bassist for my brother." He practiced up to six hours per day, even after he joined Metallica. Along with classical and jazz, Burton's other early influences varied from Southern rock and country to the blues.

Burton cited Geddy Lee, Geezer Butler, Stanley Clarke, Lemmy Kilmister, and Phil Lynott as major influences on his style of bass playing.

== Career ==
While still a student at Castro Valley High School, Burton formed his first band, EZ-Street, which took its name from a Bay Area topless bar. Other members of EZ-Street included future Faith No More members Jim Martin and Mike Bordin. Burton and Martin continued their musical collaboration after becoming students at Chabot College in Hayward, California. Their second band, Agents of Misfortune, entered the Hayward Area Recreation Department's Battle of the Bands contest in 1981. Their audition was recorded on video and features some of the earliest footage of Burton's playing style. The video also shows Burton playing parts of what would soon be two Metallica songs: his signature bass solo, "(Anesthesia) – Pulling Teeth", and the chromatic intro to "For Whom the Bell Tolls". Burton joined his first professional band, Trauma, in 1982. He recorded the track "Such a Shame" with the band on the second Metal Massacre compilation.

In 1982, Trauma traveled to Los Angeles to perform at the Whisky a Go Go. Among those in attendance were James Hetfield and Lars Ulrich, both members of Metallica, which had formed the previous year. Upon hearing, as Hetfield described it, "this amazing shredding" (parts of which later became "(Anesthesia) - Pulling Teeth"), the two decided to recruit Burton for Metallica. They asked him to replace departed bassist Ron McGovney, and since Burton thought that Trauma was "starting to get a little commercial," he agreed. The idea of moving to Los Angeles did not sit well with Burton, who said he would join only if the band relocated from Los Angeles to his native San Francisco Bay Area. Metallica, eager to have Burton in the band, left to make a home in El Cerrito, a town located across the bay from San Francisco.

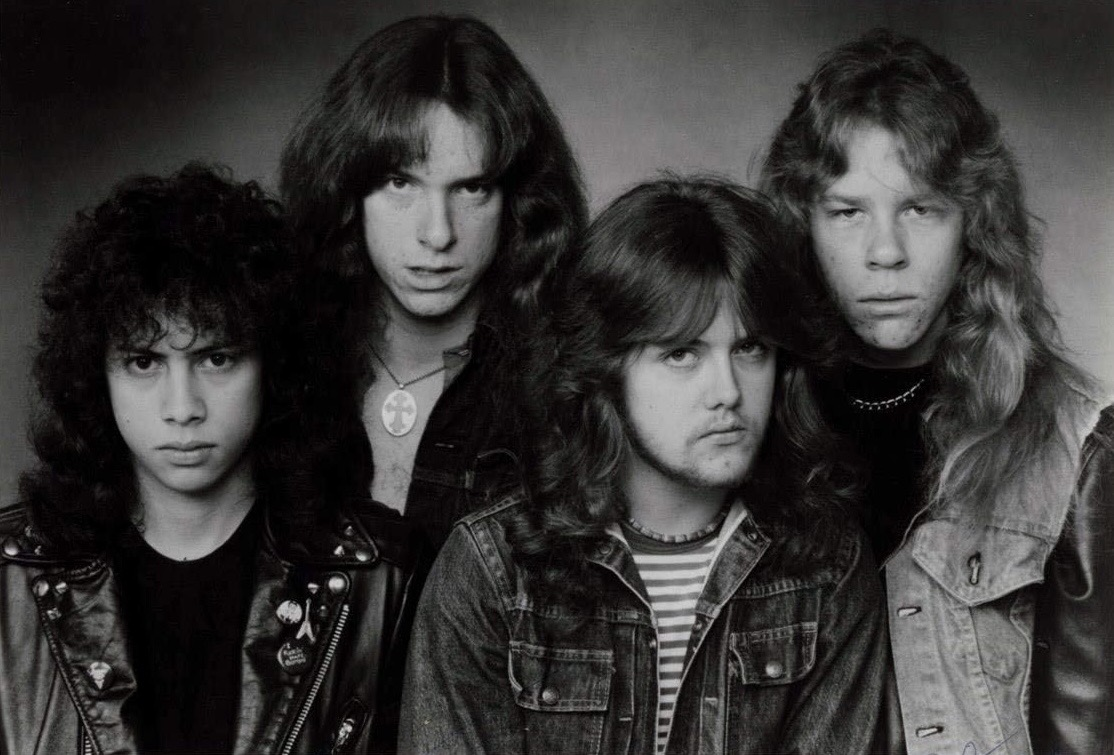
Metallica in 1983

Burton's first recording with Metallica was the Megaforce demo. A demo tape the band had made prior to Burton's joining, No Life 'til Leather, managed to come into the hands of Jon Zazula, owner of Megaforce Records. The band relocated to Old Bridge, New Jersey, and quickly secured a recording contract with Zazula's label. Their debut album, Kill 'Em All, features Burton's showcase, "(Anesthesia) – Pulling Teeth", which displayed his use of effect pedals, such as a wah-wah pedal and Electro Harmonix Big Muff, which are ‍not commonly used by ‍bassists.

Metallica's debut album, Kill 'Em All, was originally intended to inherit the name of one of their earlier demo releases (predating Burton's participation), which was Metal Up Your Ass, but the record company did not like the title and insisted on changing it. Burton said "We should just kill 'em all, man," which gave the band members an idea for the new title. The album was released on July 25, 1983, through Megaforce Records.

The band's second studio album, Ride the Lightning, showcased the band's rapidly evolving musical growth. Burton's songwriting abilities were growing, and he received credit on six of the album's eight songs. Burton's playing style and use of effects is notably showcased on two tracks: the chromatic intro to "For Whom the Bell Tolls" (often mistaken as a guitar intro), and the "lead bass" on "The Call of Ktulu".

The band's improving musicianship on Ride the Lightning caught the attention of major record labels. Metallica was signed to Elektra Records, and began working on their third album, Master of Puppets, which is considered by most critics to be a landmark album in heavy metal. Among the tracks featured in the album are the instrumental "Orion" (which features a prominent lead bass section) and the title track, which was Burton's favorite Metallica song. Master of Puppets was the band's commercial breakthrough release, and Burton's final album with Metallica.

Burton's final performance was in Stockholm, Sweden, at the Solnahallen Arena on September 26, 1986, one day before his death. The final song the band performed with Burton was "Fight Fire with Fire".

== Equipment ==
=== Bass guitars ===
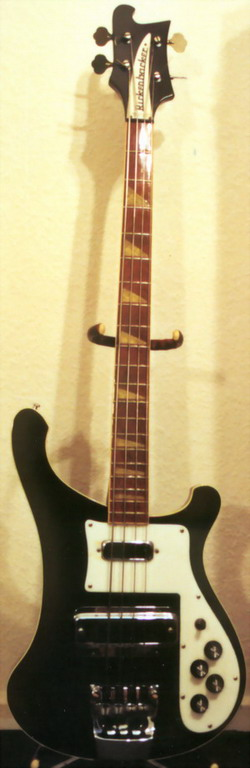
Rickenbacker 4001 bass, one of the models played by Burton

When he joined Metallica in 1982, Burton's main bass was a red Rickenbacker 4001. Burton made several modifications to it, in particular removing the stock high-gain pickups, which did not suit his heavy use of effects pedals and aggressive finger-style playing. The neck pickup was swapped with a Gibson "Mudbucker" and the bridge with a Seymour Duncan "Classic Stack Jazz Bass" pickup. Burton used this 4001 on Kill 'Em All and several tracks on Ride The Lightning before technical problems forced him to retire it. Burton then briefly played an Alembic Spoiler II before it was stolen from his car. In 1985, Burton began endorsing Japanese manufacturer Aria. He initially played an SB1000 model before receiving his signature "SB Black n' Gold" bass, which he used on Master Of Puppets.

In 2013, Aria released a replica of Burton's bass, called the Aria Pro II Cliff Burton Signature Bass. The company had received permission from Burton's family and Metallica ‍to produce the instrument. The bass ‍was officially unveiled at the Winter ‍NAMM Show in Anaheim, California. On January 25, 2013, Burton's father Ray ‍attended the press conference where he signed autographs and talked about Burton's life and the instrument. Current Metallica bassist Robert Trujillo was also present and was the first to try out the bass, playing parts of "(Anesthesia) – Pulling Teeth". Ray Burton said, "What a beautiful instrument and a wonderful tribute to Cliff."

=== Amplifiers ===
Burton initially combined a Sunn Beta Bass Amp with a Peavey Mark IV Series 400 head in early gigs, before switching to a pair of Mesa/Boogie D-180 heads for the heavy tone he became known for. One D-180 was used for his clean signal, the other for his effects chain. Burton favored Mesa cabinets, as well, combining a 4x12 and 1x15.

=== Effects ===
Burton used many effects pedals in his career. He made "distinctive" use of the Morley Power Wah Boost, using it to filter through frequencies for his bass solos. Burton included the Power Wah Boost on his pedalboard for almost every Metallica concert, while the effect can be heard on tracks like "For Whom The Bell Tolls". Other effects used include the Boss CS-2 Compression Sustainer, Ibanez TS-9 Tubescreamer, and Ibanez HD1500 Harmonics/Delay rack unit.

== Death ==
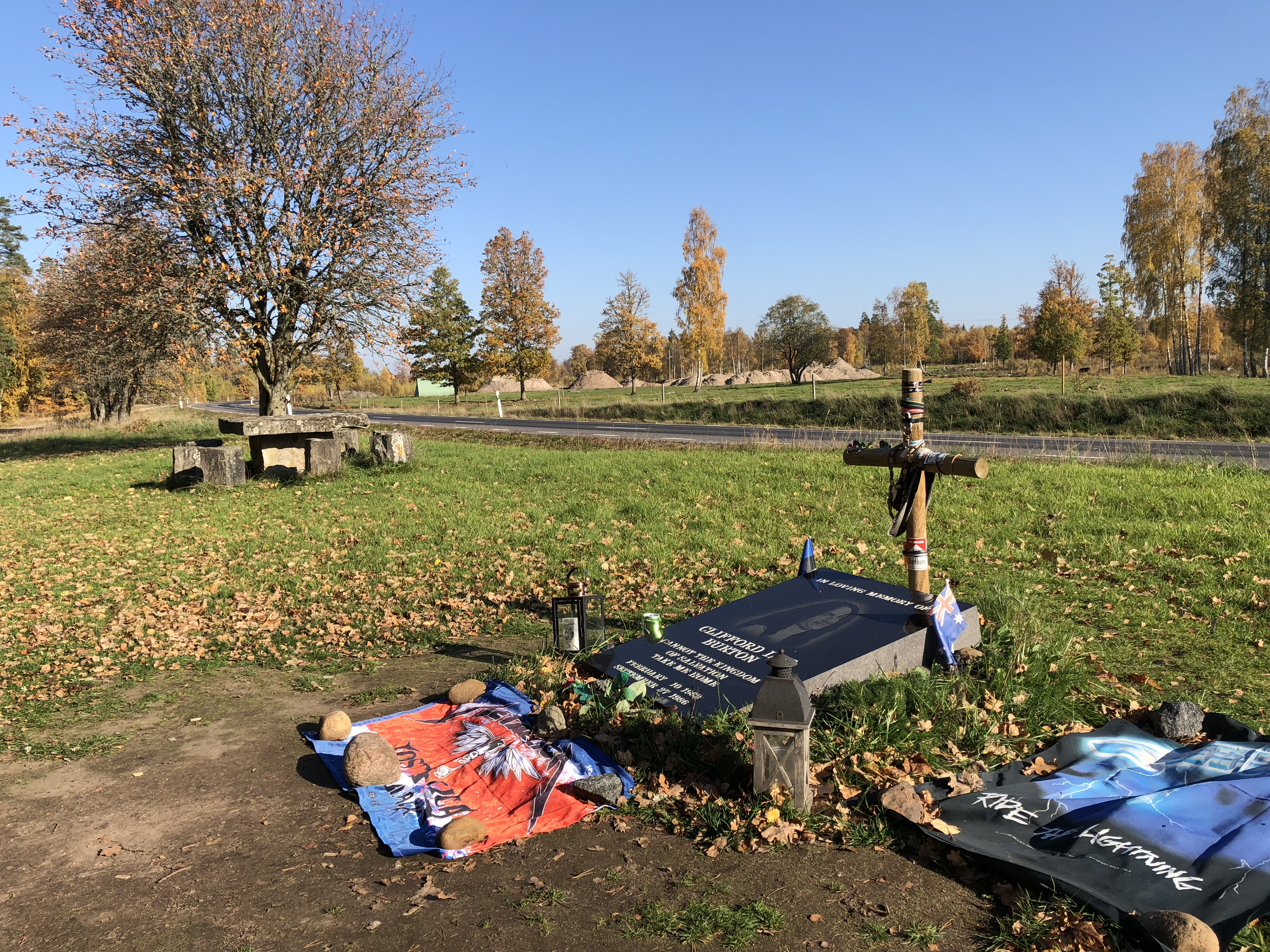
Cliff Burton memorial stone October 15, 2018

Burton's final performance with Metallica on September 26, 1986, was hosted at Solnahallen in Stockholm, Sweden, on the Damage Inc. tour in support of the Master of Puppets album. Their next scheduled show at the Saga Theater in Copenhagen, Denmark, had their tour bus driving south overnight along European route E4 (now G 557). Band members complained that the bunks on their tour bus were unsatisfactory and uncomfortable. The story of how Burton won the bunk differs between the two band members; as Kirk Hammett stated on VH1's Behind the Music, he and Burton drew cards, and Burton picked the ace of spades, thereby getting the first choice of bunk. Burton told Hammett "I want your bunk". Hammett replied "Fine, take my bunk, I'll sleep up front, it's probably better anyway". However, Ulrich's version of the event was that Hammett and Burton drew straws, while Burton drew the long straw, winning the choice of bunk. Burton was sleeping when, according to the driver, shortly before 7 a.m. on September 27, the bus skidded off the road 12 miles [19 km] north of Ljungby, just north of Dörarp, and flipped onto the grass in Kronoberg County. With no safety restraints on the bunks, Burton was thrown violently through one of the windows of the bus, which fell on top of him right afterwards, killing him instantly. He was 24 years old.

The bus driver later claimed that the crash was caused by the bus hitting a patch of black ice on the road, but Hetfield later stated that he first believed the bus flipped because the driver was intoxicated. Hetfield also claimed that he walked a lengthy distance along the road unsuccessfully searching for the point in which the bus lost traction from the black ice. When local freelance photographer Lennart Wennberg (who attended the crash-scene the following morning) was asked in a later interview about the likelihood that black ice caused the accident, he said it was "out of the question" because the road was dry and the temperature around 36 °F (2 °C), too warm for ice. This was confirmed by police who, like Hetfield, also found no ice on the road. Ljungby detective Arne Pettersson was reported in a local newspaper to have said the tracks at the accident site were exactly like ones seen when drivers fall asleep at the wheel. However, the driver stated under oath that he had slept during the day and was fully rested; his testimony was confirmed by the driver of a second tour bus that was carrying the band's crew and equipment. The driver was determined not at fault for the accident and no charges were brought against him.

Burton's body was cremated and the ashes were scattered at the Maxwell Ranch. At the ceremony, the song "Orion" was played. Metallica went on to hire Jason Newsted from Flotsam and Jetsam to replace Burton on October 28, 1986. Both Ray and Jan Burton appeared at Newsted's second audition, in which Jan Burton embraced him following his hiring, telling Newsted "You are the one, Please be safe". He remained with the band until his departure on January 17, 2001.

== Legacy ==
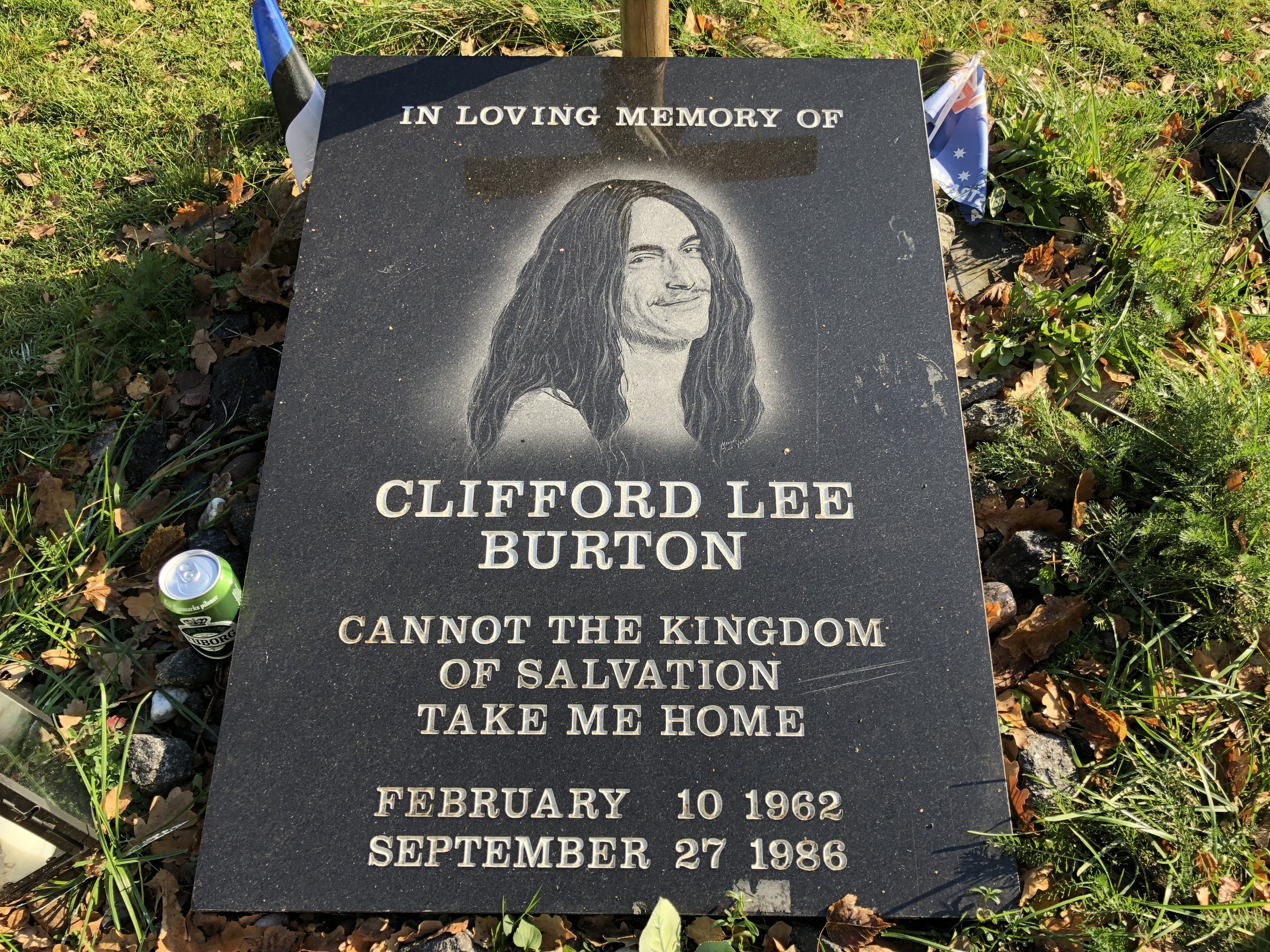
Cliff Burton memorial stone October 15, 2018

Many metal bassists have expressed admiration, or have cited Burton as an influence to their playing, including Adam Duce, Alex Webster, Chi Cheng, Dick Lövgren, Johnny Christ, Justin Chancellor, Liam Wilson, Mike D'Antonio, Martín Méndez, Paolo Gregoletto, Paul Gray, Paulo Jr., Reginald Arvizu Tony Campos, and Troy Sanders.

=== Tributes ===
Metallica wrote a tribute to Burton titled "To Live Is to Die" for their 1988 album...And Justice for All. Burton would receive a writing credit for the lyrics in the middle of the song, as well as the bass lines being a medley of unused recordings Burton had performed prior to his death.

Former Metallica guitarist and Megadeth frontman Dave Mustaine composed the song In My Darkest Hour dedicating its musical composition as a tribute to Burton. Burton remained friends with Mustaine, as he would occasionally attend Megadeth's live shows. Another friend of Burton's; Anthrax guitarist Scott Ian would dedicate their 1987 album Among the Living to Burton, as did Metal Church with The Dark.

In 2006, a memorial stone was unveiled in Sweden near the scene of the fatal crash. The lyrics "...cannot the Kingdom of Salvation take me home" from "To Live Is to Die" are written on Burton's memorial stone. On April 4, 2009, Burton was posthumously inducted into the Rock and Roll Hall of Fame, with Metallica bandmates James Hetfield, Lars Ulrich, and Kirk Hammett. Subsequent bassists Jason Newsted and Robert Trujillo were inducted as well. During the ceremony, the induction was accepted by his father Ray Burton, who shared the stage with the band and said that Cliff's mother was Metallica's biggest fan.

A biography, To Live Is to Die: The Life and Death of Metallica's Cliff Burton, written by Joel McIver, was published by Jawbone Press in June 2009. Hammett provided the book's foreword.

On the “Hardwired… to Self Destruct Deluxe" bonus track “Fade to Black (Live at Rasputin Music)" James dedicates the song to Cliff, saying “For Cliff!” and “Can you hear us Cliff?”

A 2011 reader poll from Rolling Stone placed Burton as the ninth greatest bassist of all time.

In 2017, it was revealed that Burton's parents had been donating his posthumous royalty payments to a scholarship fund for music students at his alma mater Castro Valley High School. In 2018, the Alameda County, California, Board of Supervisors issued a proclamation declaring February 10, 2018, which would have been Burton's 56th birthday, as "Cliff Burton Day" after a fan petition successfully passed. The S&M2 concert in 2019 featured San Francisco Symphony bassist Scott Pingel paying tribute to Burton by playing his signature bass solo, "(Anesthesia) – Pulling Teeth", using an electric double bass with pedal effects.

== Discography ==
=== With Metallica ===
Studio albums

- Kill 'Em All (1983)
- Ride the Lightning (1984)
- Master of Puppets (1986)
- ...And Justice for All (1988) (posthumous writing credit on "To Live Is to Die")

Video

- Cliff 'Em All (1987)

Demos

- No Life 'til Leather (1982) (credited but does not play)
- Megaforce (1983)
- Ride the Lightning (1983)
- Master of Puppets (1985)

Compilations

- Garage Inc. (1998) (featured on "Am I Evil?" and "Blitzkrieg" only)

=== With Trauma ===
- Metal Massacre II (1982) (features on "Such a Shame" only)
- Scratch and Scream (2013 reissue) (features on bonus tracks only)

=== With Apocalyptica ===
- Plays Metallica Vol. 2 (2024) ("The Call of Ktulu" cover features the original bass master track used in Ride the Lightning.)

Preceded by Ron McGovney	Metallica bassist 1982–1986	Succeeded by Jason Newsted
