= Damage, Inc. (video game) =

Cancelled video game

- A gameplay screenshot from an unfinished build of Damage, Inc. The game would have been centered around vehicle combat.
- Developer: Climax Brighton
- Publisher: Vivendi Universal Games
- Platforms: PlayStation 2 Xbox; Windows
- Release: Cancelled
- Genre: Action-adventure

Damage, Inc. was a planned action-adventure game developed by Climax Brighton and set to be published by Vivendi Universal Games. It would have been themed around the American heavy metal band Metallica, featuring its music and the likeness of its members. The gameplay was going to be centered around vehicle combat, in a post-apocalyptic setting. Players would have been able to customize their vehicle with weapons and armor, and hijack other cars.

The game was being developed in 2003, and was set to be released in 2005 for PlayStation 2, Xbox, and Windows. A trailer for the game was included on certain copies of Metallica's eighth studio album, St. Anger (2003). The game was cancelled before an official announcement was made. Concept art from the game was released online in 2011. In 2016, gameplay footage from an early build was uploaded online.

== Overview ==
Damage, Inc. was going to be a post-apocalyptic action-adventure game centered around vehicle combat. Players would have been able to customize their vehicle with different armor and weapons, and also hijack other vehicles. They would also have weapons that they could use in close-range combat, such as a handgun. Players would also be able to explore large, open levels, and a day-night cycle was featured. Devin Pacholik of Vice described the game as "Twisted Metal meets Grand Theft Auto".

The game would have been centered around Metallica, with the likeness of the band members and its music set to be used. The band members—namely Kirk Hammett, James Hetfield, Robert Trujillo, and Lars Ulrich—were all going to sport post-apocalyptic outfits. They were also going to record an original song specifically for Damage, Inc., with a music video taking elements from the game. Due to the lack of promotion for the game before its cancellation, not much is known about the game's mechanics outside of gameplay footage from an early build of the game, a teaser trailer, and concept art.

== Development ==
Damage, Inc. was being developed in 2003 by Climax Brighton, and would have been published by Vivendi Universal Games. It was planned to release in 2005. The game was initially being developed for the PlayStation 2, although versions for the Xbox and Windows were planned. The developers took inspiration from Mad Max and Grand Theft Auto III while developing the game, the former of which was serving as the basis of the game's art style. The developers also drew inspiration from Blade Runner and Waterworld. A teaser trailer for the game was included on certain promotional copies of Metallica' eighth studio album, St. Anger (2003), where it was initially untitled. No gameplay footage from the game was ever officially revealed, and the game was cancelled before a formal announcement was made.

Calum Alexander Watt's concept art for Damage, Inc.'s appearance of Metallica drummer Lars Ulrich

In 2011, Calum Alexander Watt released concept art from the game, depicting the band's members in post-apocalyptic designs. Hetfield's in-game iteration was going to sport large machine guns, while Hammett would have had a pet vulture, and Ulrich would have driven a truck covered in large megaphones. Luke Plunkett of Kotaku described Watt's concept art as "Borderlands meets Akira".

In 2016, Andrew Borman of the Strong National Museum of Play managed to acquire an unfinished demo of the game, featuring only a single, half-finished level, and shared the footage online through his YouTube channel PtoPOnline. The footage revealed that the game's title was going to be Damage, Inc., named after one of the band's songs. According to Borman, internal conflicts related to Vivendi and possibly licensing issues were what led to the project's cancellation, although he was uncertain due to the lack of information.

Borman also claimed that, following the game's cancellation, a few developers from Climax tried to revive the project as a PlayStation Portable exclusive, although these plans failed.Climax also allegedly offered to help Warner Bros. Games develop a new Mad Max game, intending to repurpose what progress had been made on Damage, Inc. for it. This plan also failed.
