= WBRS =

Radio station at Brandeis University in Waltham, Massachusetts

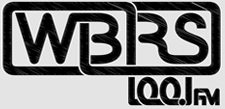
- Waltham, Massachusetts; United States
- Frequency: 100.1 MHz
- Branding: WBRS 100.1 FM

Programming
- Format: Variety

Ownership
- Owner: Brandeis University

History
- First air date: February 5, 1968
- Call sign meaning: Brandeis Radio Service

Technical information
- Licensing authority: FCC
- Facility ID: 6638
- Class: D
- ERP: 25 watts
- HAAT: 46 meters (151 ft)
- Transmitter coordinates: 42°22′9.3″N 71°15′26.2″W

Links
- Public license information: Public file; LMS
- Website: www.wbrs.org

WBRS is a student-run community and college radio station in Waltham, Massachusetts, west of Boston. The broadcast license is held by the Trustees of Brandeis University and the studio and transmitter are located on the Brandeis campus. WBRS broadcasts at 100.1 FM with an effective radiated power of 25 watts, at a height above average terrain (HAAT) of 46 meters. There is a streaming feed available at wbrs.org.

== History ==
Previous logo

The station's origins lie in a campus radio club in the 1950s, originally called WLDB (for Louis Dembitz Brandeis's initials). The club never broadcast under this callsign, which had already been assigned to an AM station in Atlantic City. The club then changed its name to WBRS ("Brandeis Radio Service"), in 1964. At the time, they broadcast via carrier current, and could only be heard on the Brandeis campus. WBRS got an FM radio license in 1968 and began broadcasting at 91.7 MHz with an FCC Class D license.

In the late 1970s, the FCC stopped issuing low power class D licenses, and stations were pushed to upgrade to class A (100 watts minimum). In dense urban markets such as Boston, this was often difficult or impossible due to band crowding and interference. WBRS negotiated with other stations in Boston to finally find a home at 100.1 MHz as a "grandfathered" class D station in 1984.

For 15 years, WBRS's signal covered many surrounding towns, as far as East Boston and the airport to the east, and Framingham and Natick to the west. In 1999, WWFX in Southbridge MA, a commercial station broadcasting at the same 100.1 MHz frequency, got a significant power increase to become a major Worcester pop station. Since then, WBRS's signal effectively reaches less than a mile to the west (towards Worcester), though it can still be heard in a few cities to the east, including parts of Boston. It can no longer be heard at all in some parts of its own city, Waltham.

A WBRS music director, Bobby Haber, founded the College Media Journal (CMJ) in 1978 at WBRS, publishing the first college radio airplay charts.

In the early 1980s, WBRS underwent several structural changes and became an all genre cooperative community radio station. A new constitution and membership contract were instituted, and membership was formally defined in terms of the contract and participating in the cooperative, rather than affiliation with Brandeis University. Members were required to volunteer for at least three hours a month to maintain good standing. The constitution called for an executive board of four elected members and a number of others appointed by the elected members. With some amendments, the constitution and contract remain in force today.

== Staffing and programming ==
The station is primarily staffed by Brandeis students and some community volunteers. It has a "block programming" format, where the schedule is mostly fixed, with various genres airing at different times during the day. For example, the schedule from noon to 2 p.m. is, usually, the Jazz Cafeteria. Genres include rock, electronic, bluegrass, Americana, Israeli music, metal, hip-hop/rap and R&B.

WBRS also has a 25+ year history of live music performances on the air. The Joint, featuring mostly electric rock, has aired weekly during the school year during that entire time, save for a six-month outage when the studios were moved across campus in 2003. A recently developed show "The Joint Talk", features interviews and unplugged performances. In Winter 2007–08, the WBRS Coffeehouse was reinstated after a hiatus of several years. Airing Friday mornings, this show features acoustic bands live on the air.

WBRS also is the home of Brandeis men's and women's basketball and men's baseball in the spring as well as sports talk all year long on its five sports-talk radio shows. The sports-talk radio shows are caller-friendly and encourage listener participation through giveaways and off-site broadcasts. Graduates from the WBRS Sports Department have gone on to professional broadcasting, Mike and Mike in the Morning (radio show on ESPN Radio and ESPN2), working for ESPN, and covering professional and collegiate sports teams as reporters, among other things. WBRS also has several news talk shows and a headline news broadcast Monday-Thursday.

The news department at WBRS is run entirely by Brandeis students. WBRS News produces a 90-minute news block, titled "Newstalk 90," airing Monday–Thursday 16:30–18:00. "Newstalk 90" is divided into two blocks: (1) "Datebook," a daily half-hour of news (16:30–17:00), has up-to-the minute satellite news wire service, Brandeis news, as well as weather, sports, business and entertainment. (2) Hour-long live Talk Shows (17:00–18:00), each day with a different theme. "Entertainment Talk" featuring the latest news in the world of entertainment. "Your Brandeis World" features guests and topics that are of particular relevance to the Brandeis Community. In the past, guests on the show included University President Jehuda Reinharz, world-renowned economist Olivier Blanchard of MIT, as well as an exclusive 2004 interview with then Chairman of the President's Council of Economic Advisers, Gregory Mankiw. The program also dedicated a special show celebrating the NEJS Department's 50th Anniversary, where then hosts Emmanuel Grenader and Hillel Sternlicht interviewed numerous members of the NEJS department, Professor Anthony Polonsky, Professor Marc Brettler, amongst many others. "Sports Cafe" features sports news and discussion of the latest headlines and stories from the world of national, international, as well as local Brandeis sports. "Spin Zone," a political talk show. These shows also feature live calls from the listeners.

There is no formal classroom setting associated with WBRS. However, all of the management positions are held by students, with annual elections by the WBRS staff according to the WBRS Constitution.

== See also ==
- Campus radio
- List of college radio stations in the United States
