= Peter Mensch =

American music manager

- Born: Peter David Mensch; March 28, 1953 (age 72); New York City, U.S.
- Education: Brandeis University (B.A.); University of Chicago (M.A.)
- Occupations: Music manager; Entrepreneur
- Years active: 1977–present
- Known for: Co-founder of Q Prime
- Spouse(s): Su Wathan (m. 1981; div. ?); Melissa Meyer (m. 1990; div. 2010); Louise Mensch (m. 2011; div. 2019)
- Children: 3

Peter Mensch (born March 28, 1953) is an American music manager and entrepreneur. He co-founded the management company Q Prime alongside Cliff Burnstein. The company's first client was Def Leppard, and it has since managed the careers of many notable acts, including Metallica and Cage The Elephant. The Financial Times has called Q Prime "one of the most admired artist management companies".

Mensch started his career in music management at the age of 26, managing AC/DC at the company Leber-Krebs.

== Early life and education ==
Peter David Mensch was born in New York City, the eldest of three children to Martin, an attorney, and Jean Mensch, an educator. His family is Jewish.

His sister, Barbara Sena Mensch, was the youngest hostage of the Dawson's Field hijackings of September 6, 1970. Mensch graduated from Scarsdale High School in 1971. He attended Brandeis University and worked as a music director for the college radio station, where he met Cliff Burnstein. After graduating from Brandeis, he received his master's degree in Marketing from the University of Chicago.

== Career ==
=== Blank Records and Leber-Krebs (1977–1982) ===
Mensch began his professional career after graduating from the University of Chicago. His first assignment was as a label manager with Blank Records in New York. Shortly thereafter, he joined mega-talent firm Leber-Krebs as a tour accountant. He worked with such acts as Aerosmith and Scorpions. As a tour accountant with Aerosmith, Mensch came upon the Australian rock band AC/DC, and persuaded them to swap their previous manager, Michael Browning, for Leber-Krebs. Mensch was assigned to manage the band as his first client; he was 26 years old.

On the advice of his friend Cliff Burnstein, then at Mercury Records, Mensch targeted the British group Def Leppard. He booked the band as support act on an AC/DC tour. A BBC documentary on the band records their unhappiness with their early managers Pete Martin and Frank Stuart-Brown, following a fist-fight between singer Joe Elliott and Martin. The film quotes Mensch as saying Burnstein told him "I don't care if they have managers...steal them from another set of managers." The band's drummer Rick Allen recollects that he did approach Mensch, and Mensch signed them to Leber-Krebs.

=== Q Prime (1982–present) ===
After a disagreement with Leber-Krebs over royalties, Mensch was terminated from that firm and started Q Prime with Cliff Burnstein. Def Leppard was the sole client to come with the new firm.

Q Prime made their name in heavy metal music, managing, at various times, AC/DC, Scorpions, Def Leppard, Dokken, Tesla, Suicidal Tendencies, Queensrÿche, and Metallica. In the early nineties, their roster expanded to include alternative rock bands such as the Smashing Pumpkins, Hole, and Veruca Salt. They co-managed Madonna for one album, Ray of Light (1998), and were creative consultants for the Rolling Stones' Steel Wheels Tour in 1989–1990. They managed Led Zeppelin for their reunion show, and Jimmy Page as a solo artist for several years after that. They have also managed Shania Twain for part of her career. The firm's present roster includes Metallica, Cage The Elephant, Foals, Silversun Pickups, and others. They additionally manage country acts from their Q Prime South imprint, including Eric Church and Ashley McBryde. They managed the opera singer Renée Fleming for her crossover album Dark Hope.

According to an interview with The Sunday Times, Mensch stated that he had assisted with the sale of "hundreds of millions" of records, adding "I can't be more specific than that." In 2014, he did not return to manage AC/DC, but hinted that the band were to headline the Saturday night at Glastonbury Festival in 2015.

== Personal life ==
Mensch married Su Wathan, former girlfriend of Gary Numan, in 1981. They later divorced. He has three children by his second wife, Melissa Meyer, whom he married in 1990, and divorced in 2010. On February 17, 2011, in a Manhattan courthouse, he married his third wife, Louise Mensch, then member of British Parliament, despite their political differences (Louise alleges that Peter is a communist). Louise subsequently became widely known in the U.S. for her reporting and speculation about connections between the Trump administration and the Russian government. The two split up in 2017 and divorced in 2019.

Mensch currently lives in Manhattan.
