= David Krebs =

American music manager

- Occupations: Music manager; entrepreneur; record executive
- Known for: Partner at Leber-Krebs; managed AC/DC, Aerosmith, Ted Nugent, Scorpions

David Krebs is an American music producer and manager. He managed the careers of artists including AC/DC (the ninth bestselling music act in American history), Aerosmith (twelfth on that same list), Ted Nugent, Scorpions, Trans-Siberian Orchestra, New York Dolls, Chumbawamba, Adam Bomb, Def Leppard, and Michael Bolton.

Krebs was one of the founders of the Texxas Jam concert festival, and has produced notable Broadway and theatrical productions. Artists he has represented have reached total sales in the hundreds of millions.

Krebs was featured in a David Lee Roth biography written by Darren Paltrowitz, with relation to his work on the Texxas Jam.

Since the early 2000s, Krebs has worked alongside composer/conductor Brent Havens and famed artist manager Mark Puma (Twisted Sister, Zebra, TNT, Kix) on Windborne Music's The Music of Symphonic Rock series, which regularly headlines theaters and festivals around the world.

== Early life ==
After earning a Bachelor of Arts in Political Science, a Master's in Business Administration, and a Juris Doctor degree from Columbia University, Krebs launched his career in the mailroom of the William Morris Agency. He later switched to the business affairs department, and then became a successful agent in the music department. His first notable client at William Morris was reportedly Don McLean.
