= Metallica discography =

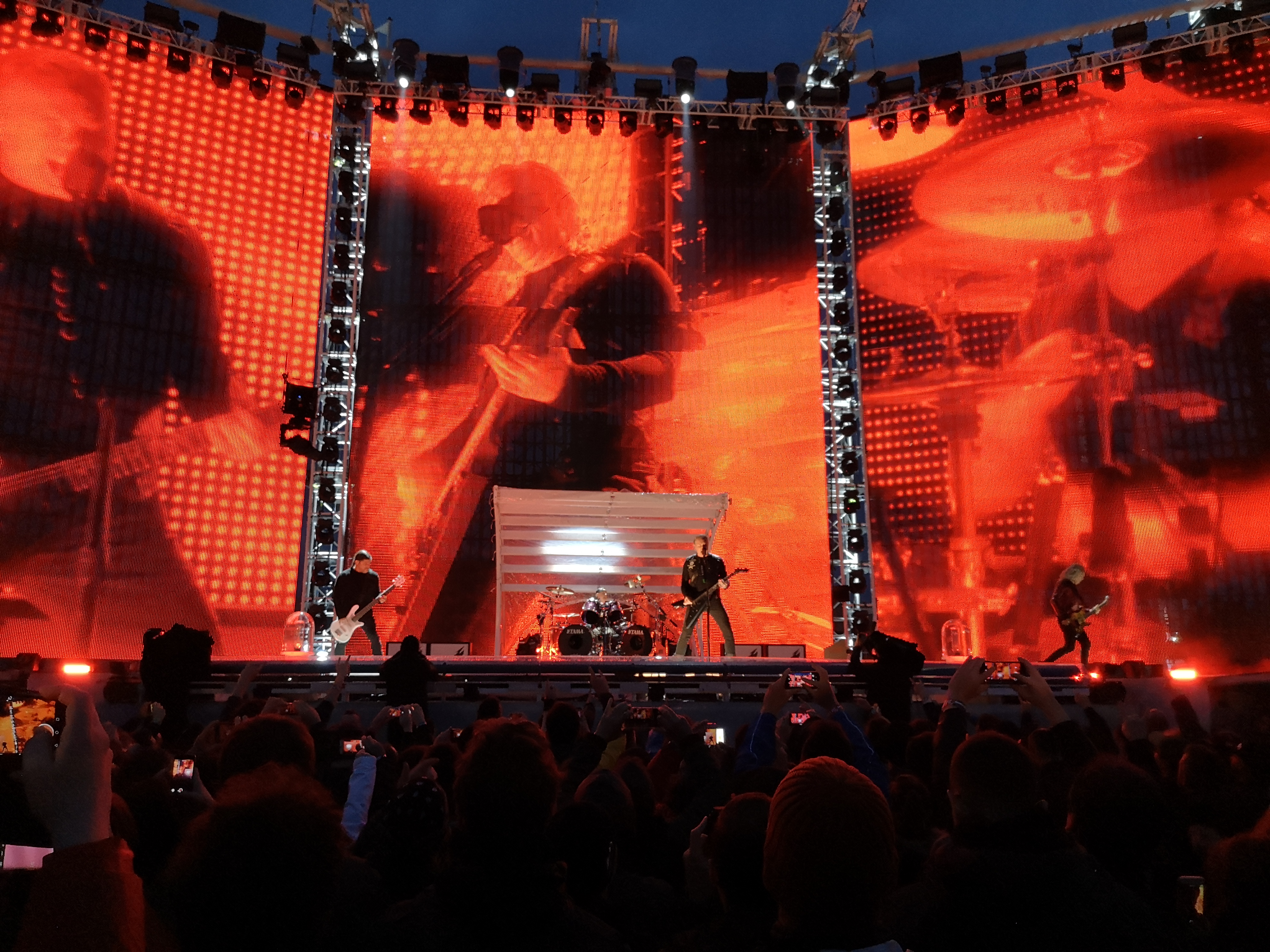
- Metallica playing at the San Siro in Milano, Italy in 2019
- Studio albums: 11
- Extended plays: 4
- Soundtrack albums: 1
- Live albums: 8
- Tribute albums: 3
- Singles: 50
- Video albums: 10
- Music videos: 43
- Collaboration albums: 1
- Covers albums: 1
- Box sets: 3

The discography of American heavy metal band Metallica includes 11 studio albums, one covers album, eight live albums, three extended plays, 49 singles, 10 video albums, 43 music videos, one soundtrack album, one collaboration album and three box sets. They are a San Francisco-based metal band formed in 1981 by James Hetfield (lead vocals, rhythm guitar) and Lars Ulrich (drums). After several bassist and lead guitarist changes (including Dave Mustaine), the band settled on Cliff Burton and Kirk Hammett, respectively. Metallica started playing locally, releasing their first widely circulated demo, No Life 'til Leather, in 1982. The demo caught the attention of Johny Zazula, who signed Metallica to Megaforce Records.

The band released Kill 'Em All in 1983, and the following year they released Ride the Lightning. After Ride the Lightning was released, Metallica left Megaforce and signed to Elektra Records. In March 1986, the band released its third studio album, Master of Puppets, which was Metallica's first album to be certified gold by the Recording Industry Association of America (RIAA). While promoting the album, Burton was killed in a bus accident; Jason Newsted was hired as a replacement. The band's first release to feature Newsted was The $5.98 E.P. – Garage Days Re-Revisited EP, and then followed by ...And Justice for All in August 1988, which peaked at number six on the Billboard 200.

Metallica's fifth, self-titled album, often called The Black Album, was released in 1991 and debuted at number one on the Billboard 200. The band embarked on a two-year tour in support of the album. Metallica has since been certified 2× Diamond by the RIAA. Metallica followed with the release of Load and Reload in 1996 and 1997, respectively. Both albums debuted at number one on the Billboard 200. After the release of Garage Inc. (1998) and S&M (1999), Newsted (who would later join Voivod) left the band. Metallica recorded St. Anger without an official bassist (bass parts for the album sessions were played by the band's long-time producer Bob Rock). Bassist Robert Trujillo joined Metallica in 2003. In 2008, the band released their ninth studio album, Death Magnetic, which was produced by Rick Rubin and distributed through Warner Bros. Records. In April 2009, the band's catalogue was released on the iTunes Store as The Metallica Collection. A collaborative album with Lou Reed, Lulu, was released in 2011.

In 2013, Metallica released the movie Metallica: Through the Never and its accompanying soundtrack. Metallica then started writing their 10th studio album, Hardwired... to Self-Destruct, which was released in 2016. It became the band's sixth album to debut at number one on the Billboard 200 and topped the charts in 57 countries. Metallica released their 11th studio album, 72 Seasons, in 2023. It debuted at number two on the Billboard 200, becoming their first album since ...And Justice for All not to debut at number one. Nevertheless, it was their first to debut at number one in the UK since Death Magnetic. Metallica has sold more than 150 million albums worldwide, with over 67 million records in the United States alone (56.3 million albums since 1991 when SoundScan started tracking actual sales figures).

== Albums ==
=== Studio albums ===
List of studio albums, with selected chart positions, sales figures and certifications
Title	Album details	Peak chart positions										Sales	Certifications
Title	Album details	US	AUS	CAN	FIN	GER	NOR	NZ	SWE	SWI	UK	Sales	Certifications
Kill 'Em All	Released: July 25, 1983; Label: Megaforce	66 (Note: Kill 'Em All entered the Billboard 200 chart in 1986 and peaked at No. 155. The Elektra Records re-issue peaked at No. 120 in 1988. The 2016 re-mastered release peaked at No. 66.)	55	66 (Note: Kill 'Em All peaked at No. 66 in 2008.)	12	17	—	—	28	31	142	US: 4,500,000 (Note: United States sales figures for Kill 'Em All as of March, 2023. This does not include copies sold before Nielsen SoundScan began tracking sales data on May 25, 1991.)	RIAA: 4× Platinum; ARIA: 2× Platinum; BPI: Gold; BVMI: Gold; MC: Platinum
Ride the Lightning	Released: July 27, 1984; Label: Megaforce	48 (Note: Ride the Lightning peaked at No. 100 in 1985. The 2016 re-mastered release peaked at No. 48.)	38	50 (Note: Ride the Lightning peaked at No. 50 in 2008.)	9	21	40	32	22	35	87	US: 6,950,000 (Note: United States sales figures for Ride the Lightning as of March, 2023. This does not include copies sold before Nielsen SoundScan began tracking sales data on May 25, 1991.)	RIAA: 6× Platinum; ARIA: 3× Platinum; BPI: Platinum; BVMI: Platinum; MC: Platinum
Master of Puppets	Released: March 3, 1986; Label: Elektra	29	33	38 (Note: Master of Puppets peaked at No. 38 in 2008.)	5	4	30	33	14	17	41	US: 7,980,000 (Note: United States sales figures for Master of Puppets as of March, 2023. This does not include copies sold before Nielsen SoundScan began tracking sales data on May 25, 1991.); FIN: 57,647	RIAA: 8× Platinum; ARIA: 3× Platinum; BPI: Platinum; BVMI: Platinum; IFPI FIN: Platinum; MC: 6× Platinum; RMNZ: Platinum
...And Justice for All	Released: August 25, 1988; Label: Elektra	6	16	13	1	3	8	36	5	7	4	US: 9,700,000 (Note: United States sales figures for ...And Justice for All as of March, 2023. This does not include copies sold before Nielsen SoundScan began tracking sales data on May 25, 1991.); FIN: 51,051	RIAA: 8× Platinum; ARIA: 3× Platinum; BPI: Platinum; BVMI: 2× Platinum; IFPI FIN: Platinum; IFPI NOR: Platinum; IFPI SWI: Platinum; MC: 3× Platinum; RMNZ: Platinum
Metallica	Released: August 12, 1991; Label: Elektra	1	1	1	1	1	1	1	4	1	1	US: 17,300,000; FIN: 112,856	RIAA: 2× Diamond; ARIA: 13× Platinum; BPI: 3× Platinum; BVMI: 4× Platinum; IFPI FIN: 2× Platinum; IFPI NOR: 3× Platinum; IFPI SWE: Platinum; IFPI SWI: 4× Platinum; MC: Diamond; RMNZ: 12× Platinum
Load	Released: June 4, 1996; Label: Elektra	1	1	1	1	1	1	1	1	1	1	US: 5,400,000; FIN: 64,384	RIAA: 5× Platinum; ARIA: 5× Platinum; BPI: Platinum; BVMI: 5× Gold; IFPI FIN: Platinum; IFPI NOR: Platinum; IFPI SWE: Platinum; MC: 4× Platinum
Reload	Released: November 18, 1997; Label: Elektra	1	2	2	1	1	1	1	1	1	4	US: 4,480,000; FIN: 45,271	RIAA: 4× Platinum; ARIA: 5× Platinum; BPI: Gold; BVMI: 5× Gold; IFPI FIN: Platinum; IFPI SWE: Platinum; IFPI SWI: Platinum; MC: 2× Platinum
St. Anger	Released: June 5, 2003; Label: Elektra	1	1	1	1	1	1	1	1	2	3	US: 2,000,000; FIN: 35,725; WW: 6,000,000	RIAA: 2× Platinum; ARIA: 3× Platinum; BPI: Gold; BVMI: 2× Platinum; IFPI FIN: Platinum; IFPI NOR: Platinum; IFPI SWE: Platinum; IFPI SWI: Platinum; MC: 2× Platinum; RMNZ: 2× Platinum
Death Magnetic	Released: September 12, 2008; Label: Warner Bros.	1	1	1	1	1	1	1	1	1	1	US: 2,100,000; FIN: 79,415; NOR: 64,000; UK: 330,398	RIAA: 2× Platinum; ARIA: 3× Platinum; BPI: Platinum; BVMI: 5× Gold; IFPI FIN: 2× Platinum; IFPI SWE: 2× Platinum; IFPI SWI: Platinum; MC: 4× Platinum; RMNZ: 2× Platinum
Hardwired... to Self-Destruct	Released: November 18, 2016; Label: Blackened	1	1	1	1	1	1	1	1	1	2	US: 1,290,000; UK: 166,492; WW: 2,100,000	RIAA: Platinum; ARIA: Platinum; BPI: Gold; BVMI: 2× Platinum; IFPI NOR: Gold; IFPI SWE: Platinum; MC: 3× Platinum; RMNZ: Gold
72 Seasons	Released: April 14, 2023; Label: Blackened	2	1	1	1	1	2	1	1	1	1	US: 373,000	BPI: Silver; BVMI: Gold
"—" denotes a recording that did not chart or was not released in that territory.

=== Cover albums ===
List of cover albums, with selected chart positions, sales figures and certifications
Title	Album details	Peak chart positions										Sales	Certifications
Title	Album details	US	AUS	CAN	FIN	GER	NOR	NZ	SWE	SWI	UK	Sales	Certifications
Garage Inc.	Released: November 24, 1998; Label: Elektra	2	2	3	1	1	1	3	1	10	29	US: 3,350,000; FIN: 27,446	RIAA: 5× Platinum; ARIA: 3× Platinum; BPI: Gold; BVMI: Platinum; IFPI FIN: Gold; IFPI NOR: Gold; IFPI SWE: Platinum; IFPI SWI: Gold; RMNZ: Platinum

=== Live albums ===
List of live albums, with selected chart positions, sales figures and certifications
Title	Album details	Peak chart positions										Sales	Certifications
Title	Album details	US	AUS	CAN	FIN	GER	NOR	NZ	SWE	SWI	UK	Sales	Certifications
Live Shit: Binge & Purge	Released: November 23, 1993; Label: Elektra	26	18	40	—	68	32	—	—	—	54		RIAA: 21× Platinum; BVMI: Gold
S&M (with San Francisco Symphony)	Released: November 23, 1999; Label: Elektra	2	1	4	2	1	1	11	1	4	33	US: 2,500,000; FIN: 22,831	RIAA: 6× Platinum; ARIA: 3× Platinum; BPI: Platinum; BVMI: 5× Gold; IFPI FIN: Gold; IFPI SWE: Platinum; IFPI SWI: 2× Platinum; MC: 3× Platinum; RMNZ: 2× Platinum
Orgullo, Pasión, y Gloria: Tres Noches en la Ciudad de México	Released: November 30, 2009; Label: Universal	—	—	—	—	—	—	—	—	—	—		
Six Feet Down Under	Released: September 20, 2010; Label: Warner Bros.	—	—	—	—	—	—	—	—	—	—		
The Big Four: Live from Sofia, Bulgaria (with Slayer, Megadeth and Anthrax)	Released: November 2, 2010; Label: Warner Bros.	—	71	—	31	59	—	—	—	63	—		
Six Feet Down Under Part II	Released: November 12, 2010; Label: Warner Bros.	—	—	—	—	—	—	—	—	—	—		
Live at Grimey's	Released: November 26, 2010; Label: Universal	—	—	—	—	—	—	—	—	—	—		
Liberté, Égalité, Fraternité, Metallica!	Released: April 16, 2016; Label: Blackened	—	—	—	—	—	—	—	—	—	—		
Helping Hands...Live & Acoustic at the Masonic	Released: February 1, 2019; Label: Blackened	—	—	—	—	—	—	—	—	—	—		
Live in Chile (1993 – 2017)	Released: April 15, 2020; Label: Blackened	—	—	—	—	—	—	—	—	—	—		
Live in Argentina (1993 – 2017)	Released: April 18, 2020; Label: Blackened	—	—	—	—	—	—	—	—	—	—		
Live in Brazil (1993 – 2017)	Released: April 21, 2020; Label: Blackened	—	—	—	—	—	—	—	—	—	—		
S&M2 (with San Francisco Symphony)	Released: August 28, 2020; Label: Blackened	4	1	4	3	1	6	7	7	2	2		BVMI: Gold
"—" denotes a recording that did not chart or was not released in that territory.

=== Soundtrack albums ===
List of soundtrack albums, with selected chart positions
Title	Album details	Peak chart positions									
Title	Album details	US	AUS	AUT	CAN	FIN	GER	NZ	SWE	SWI	UK
Metallica: Through the Never	Released: September 24, 2013; Label: Blackened	9	16	4	9	11	6	11	30	16	36

=== Collaboration albums ===
List of collaboration albums, with selected chart positions
Title	Album details	Peak chart positions										Sales
Title	Album details	US	AUS	AUT	CAN	FIN	GER	NZ	SWE	SWI	UK	Sales
Lulu (with Lou Reed)	Released: October 31, 2011; Label: Warner Bros.	36	33	25	16	6	11	12	9	14	36	WW: 280,000

=== Tribute albums ===
List of tribute albums, with selected chart positions
Title	Album details	Peak chart positions				Sales	Certifications
Title	Album details	US	CAN	FIN	UK	Sales	Certifications
Plays Metallica by Four Cellos	Released: May 13, 1996; Label: Mercury/PolyGram	—	—	7	—	FIN: 23,303	FIN: Platinum
A Tribute to the Four Horsemen	Released: December 2, 2002; Label: Nuclear Blast	—	—	—	—		
The Metallica Blacklist	Released: September 10, 2021; Label: Blackened	103	44	48	27		

== Extended plays ==
List of extended plays, with selected chart positions and certifications
Title	Album details	Peak chart positions										Certifications
Title	Album details	US	AUS	AUT	CAN	FIN	GER	NZ	SPA	SWI	UK	Certifications
The $5.98 E.P. / $9.98 CD: Garage Days Re-Revisited	Released: August 21, 1987; Label: Elektra	18	69	16	40	—	10	—	12	62	27	RIAA: Platinum; IFPI FIN: Gold; MC: Gold
Some Kind of Monster	Released: July 13, 2004; Label: Elektra	37	—	—	—	—	—	—	—	—	—	
Beyond Magnetic	Released: December 13, 2011; Label: Warner Bros.	29	19	30	15	2	22	22	25	—	—	
M72 World Tour: Mexico City	Released: March 13, 2025; Label: Blackened	—	—	—	—	—	—	—	—	—	—	
"—" denotes a recording that did not chart or was not released in that territory.

== Box sets ==
List of box sets, with selected chart positions
Title	Album details	Peak chart positions
Title	Album details	UK
The Good, the Bad & the Live	Released: May 7, 1990; Label: Vertigo	56
Limited-Edition Vinyl Box Set	Released: November 23, 2004; Label: Rhino	—
The Metallica Collection	Released: April 14, 2009; Label: Warner Bros.	—
"—" denotes a recording that did not chart or was not released in that territory.

== Singles ==
=== 1980s ===
List of singles, with selected chart positions and certifications, showing year released and album name
Title	Year	Peak chart positions										Certifications	Album
Title	Year	US	US Main. Rock	AUS	GER	NLD	NOR	NZ	SWE	SWI	UK	Certifications	Album
"Whiplash"	1983	—	—	—	—	—	—	—	—	—	—		Kill 'Em All
"Jump in the Fire"	1984	—	—	—	—	—	—	30	—	—	—		Kill 'Em All
"Creeping Death"	1984	—	—	—	—	—	—	—	—	—	—	RIAA: Gold; ARIA: Gold; BPI: Silver	Ride the Lightning
"Master of Puppets" (Note: All chart positions occurred in 2022.)	1986	35	18	19	100	— (Note: "Master of Puppets" did not enter the Dutch Single Top 100, but peaked at number four on the Single Tip chart.)	—	17	69	—	22	RIAA: 3× Platinum; ARIA: 3× Platinum; BPI: Platinum; BVMI: Gold; RMNZ: 3× Platinum	Master of Puppets
"Harvester of Sorrow"	1988	—	—	100	—	—	—	30	—	—	20		...And Justice for All
"Eye of the Beholder"	1988	—	—	—	—	—	—	—	—	—	—		...And Justice for All
"One"	1989	35	46	5	31	3	4	13	3	22	13	RIAA: 5× Platinum; ARIA: 4× Platinum; BPI: Gold; RMNZ: 3× Platinum	...And Justice for All
"—" denotes a recording that did not chart or was not released in that territory.

=== 1990s ===
List of singles, with selected chart positions and certifications, showing year released and album name
Title	Year	Peak chart positions										Certifications	Album
Title	Year	US	US Main. Rock	AUS	GER	NLD	NOR	NZ	SWE	SWI	UK	Certifications	Album
"Enter Sandman"	1991	16	10	10	1	10	2	8	14	11	5	RIAA: 9× Platinum; ARIA: 11× Platinum; BPI: 3× Platinum; BVMI: Platinum; MC: Gold; RMNZ: 7× Platinum	Metallica
"The Unforgiven"	1991	35	10	10	47	25	—	24	32	—	15	RIAA: 2× Platinum; ARIA: 3× Platinum; BPI: Silver; BVMI: Gold; RMNZ: 2× Platinum	Metallica
"Nothing Else Matters"	1992	34	11	8	9	4	3	11	12	5	6	RIAA: Gold; ARIA: 7× Platinum; BPI: 2× Platinum; BVMI: 3× Gold; IFPI SWE: Gold; RMNZ: 6× Platinum	Metallica
"Wherever I May Roam"	1992	82	25	14	30	22	2	8	28	—	25	RIAA: Platinum; ARIA: 2× Platinum; BPI: Silver; RMNZ: Platinum	Metallica
"Sad but True"	1992	98	15	48	42	10	5	42	31	—	20	RIAA: Platinum; ARIA: 2× Platinum; RMNZ: Platinum	Metallica
"Until It Sleeps"	1996	10	1	1	15	5	2	11	1	22	5	RIAA: Gold; ARIA: Platinum; IFPI NOR: Gold; IFPI SWE: Gold	Load
"Hero of the Day"	1996	60	1	2	39	25	8	21	10	—	17	RIAA: Gold; ARIA: Platinum; RMNZ: Gold	Load
"Mama Said"	1996	—	—	24	—	58	13	—	24	—	19	ARIA: Gold	Load
"King Nothing"	1997	90	6	—	—	—	—	—	—	—	—	RIAA: Gold	Load
"The Memory Remains"	1997	28	3	6	20	15	3	23	4	30	13	RIAA: Gold; ARIA: Platinum; RMNZ: Gold	Reload
"The Unforgiven II"	1998	59	2	9	23	16	8	22	8	—	15	ARIA: Platinum; RMNZ: Gold	Reload
"Fuel"	1998	—	6	2	57	53	—	35	49	—	31	ARIA: 2× Platinum; BPI: Silver; RMNZ: Platinum	Reload
"Turn the Page"	1998	— (Note: "Turn the Page" did not enter the Billboard Hot 100, but peaked at number two on the Bubbling Under Hot 100 Singles chart, which acts as an extension to the Hot 100.)	1	11	23	42	11	22	13	—	—	RIAA: Platinum; ARIA: Platinum; IFPI SWE: Gold; RMNZ: Gold	Garage Inc.
"Whiskey in the Jar"	1999	— (Note: "Whiskey in the Jar" did not enter the Billboard Hot 100, but peaked at number 24 on the Bubbling Under Hot 100 Singles chart, which acts as an extension to the Hot 100.)	4	14	23	47	4	41	15	55	29	ARIA: 2× Platinum; BPI: Gold; BVMI: Gold; IFPI NOR: Gold; IFPI SWE: Gold; RMNZ: 2× Platinum	Garage Inc.
"Die, Die My Darling"	1999	—	26	82	—	—	—	—	—	—	—		Garage Inc.
"Nothing Else Matters '99" (with San Francisco Symphony)	1999	—	—	28	2	3	—	—	—	4	—		S&M
"—" denotes a recording that did not chart or was not released in that territory.

=== 2000s ===
List of singles, with selected chart positions and certifications, showing year released and album name
Title	Year	Peak chart positions										Certifications	Album
Title	Year	US	US Main. Rock	AUS	GER	NLD	NOR	NZ	SWE	SWI	UK	Certifications	Album
"No Leaf Clover" (with San Francisco Symphony)	2000	74	1	41	40	41	9	—	50	99	—		S&M
"I Disappear"	2000	76	1	—	14	36	8	—	25	20	35	RIAA: Gold; IFPI SWE: Gold	Mission: Impossible 2 soundtrack
"St. Anger"	2003	— (Note: "St. Anger" did not enter the Billboard Hot 100, but peaked at number seven on the Bubbling Under Hot 100 Singles chart, which acts as an extension to the Hot 100.)	2	15	15	12	6	38	9	28	9	ARIA: Platinum	St. Anger
"Frantic"	2003	—	21	22	21	22	5	23	13	57	16		St. Anger
"The Unnamed Feeling"	2004	—	28	23	24	20	10	—	37	47	42		St. Anger
"Some Kind of Monster"	2004	—	19	—	—	—	—	—	—	—	—		St. Anger
"The Day That Never Comes"	2008	31	1	18	—	20	1	14	3	32	19	RIAA: Gold; ARIA: Gold; RMNZ: Gold	Death Magnetic
"My Apocalypse"	2008	67	38	38	—	33	9	—	15	—	51		Death Magnetic
"Cyanide"	2008	50	1	48	—	—	15	—	14	—	48		Death Magnetic
"The Judas Kiss"	2008	— (Note: "The Judas Kiss" did not enter the Billboard Hot 100, but peaked at number 12 on the Bubbling Under Hot 100 Singles chart, which acts as an extension to the Hot 100.)	—	—	—	—	13	—	44	—	79		Death Magnetic
"All Nightmare Long"	2008	—	9	90	15	7	—	—	44	—	—		Death Magnetic
"Broken, Beat & Scarred"	2009	—	15	75	35	25	—	—	—	—	—		Death Magnetic
"—" denotes a recording that did not chart or was not released in that territory.

=== 2010s ===
List of singles, with selected chart positions and certifications, showing year released and album name
Title	Year	Peak chart positions								Certifications	Album
Title	Year	US Bub.	US Main. Rock	US Hard Rock Digi.	AUS	GER	NZ	SWE	UK	Certifications	Album
"The View" (with Lou Reed)	2011	—	—	—	—	—	—	—	—		Lulu
"Lords of Summer"	2014	—	—	—	—	—	—	—	141		Hardwired... to Self-Destruct bonus track
"Hardwired"	2016	19	1	1	70	—	— (Note: "Hardwired" did not enter the NZ Top 40 Singles Chart, but peaked at number 7 on the NZ Heatseeker Singles Chart.)	72	186	RIAA: Gold; ARIA: Gold	Hardwired... to Self-Destruct
"Moth into Flame"	2016	—	5	2	—	—	—	91	—		Hardwired... to Self-Destruct
"Atlas, Rise!"	2016	—	1	2	—	100	—	87	—		Hardwired... to Self-Destruct
"Now That We're Dead"	2017	—	2	7	—	—	—	69	—		Hardwired... to Self-Destruct
"Spit Out the Bone"	2017	—	4	10	—	—	—	—	—		Hardwired... to Self-Destruct
"—" denotes a recording that did not chart or was not released in that territory.

=== 2020s ===
List of singles, with selected chart positions and certifications, showing year released and album name
Title	Year	Peak chart positions										Album
Title	Year	US Bub.	US Main. Rock	US Hard Rock Digi.	US Rock	AUS Digital	GER Air.	NZ Hot	SWE	UK Rock	UK Sales	Album
"All Within My Hands" (with San Francisco Symphony)	2020	—	1	— (Note: "All Within My Hands" did not enter the US Billboard Hard Rock Digital Songs chart, but peaked at number 4 on the US Hot Hard Rock Songs chart.)	— (Note: "All Within My Hands" did not enter the US Billboard Hot Rock & Alternative Songs chart, but peaked at number 4 on the US Rock & Alternative Airplay chart.)	—	—	—	—	—	—	S&M2
"Lux Æterna"	2022	13	1	1	15	18	38	7	—	10	28	72 Seasons
"Screaming Suicide"	2023	—	1	3	32	25	37	20	—	19	32	72 Seasons
"If Darkness Had a Son"	2023	— (Note: "If Darkness Had a Son" did not enter the US Billboard Bubbling Under Hot 100 chart, but peaked at number 1 on the US Trending Songs chart.)	— (Note: "If Darkness Had a Son" did not enter the US Billboard Mainstream Rock Songs chart, but peaked at number 6 on the US Rock Digital Songs chart.)	2	34	—	44	34	—	— (Note: "If Darkness Had a Son" did not enter the UK Singles Chart, but peaked at number 52 on the UK Singles Downloads Chart.)	53	72 Seasons
"72 Seasons"	2023	—	1	6	16	29	182	—	— (Note: "72 Seasons" did not enter the Swedish Singellista Chart, but peaked at number 16 on the Swedish Heatseeker Chart.)	11	51	72 Seasons
"Too Far Gone?"	2023	—	1	— (Note: "Too Far Gone?" did not enter the US Billboard Hard Rock Digital Songs chart, but peaked at number 10 on the US Hot Hard Rock Songs chart.)	38	—	—	—	—	—	—	72 Seasons
"—" denotes a recording that did not chart or was not released in that territory.

== Promotional singles ==
List of promotional singles, with selected chart positions and certifications, showing year released and album name
Title	Year	Peak chart positions			Certifications	Album
Title	Year	US Main. Rock	US Rock	SWI	Certifications	Album
"Fade to Black"	1984	—	—	100	RIAA: 2× Platinum; ARIA: Platinum; BPI: Silver; RMNZ: Platinum	Ride the Lightning
"For Whom the Bell Tolls"	1984	—	18	—	RIAA: 3× Platinum; ARIA: 2× Platinum; BPI: Platinum; RMNZ: 2× Platinum	Ride the Lightning
"...And Justice for All"	1988	—	—	—	RIAA: Gold	...And Justice for All
"Stone Cold Crazy"	1990	—	—	—		Elektra's 40th Anniversary
"Don't Tread on Me"	1991	—	—	—	RIAA: Gold	Metallica
"Ain't My Bitch"	1996	15	—	—		Load
"Bleeding Me"	1997	6	—	—		Load
"Better than You"	1998	7	—	—		Reload
"The Ecstasy of Gold"	2007	21	—	—		We All Love Ennio Morricone
"The End of the Line"	2009	—	—	—		Death Magnetic
"—" denotes a recording that did not chart or was not released in that territory.

== Other charted and certified songs ==
List of songs, with selected chart positions and certifications, showing year released and album name
Title	Year	Peak chart positions										Certifications	Album
Title	Year	US Bub.	US Heri. Rock	US Main. Rock	AUS	AUT	FIN	NOR	SWE	SWI	UK	Certifications	Album
"Seek & Destroy"	1983	—	—	—	—	—	—	—	—	—	—	RIAA: Platinum; ARIA: Gold; RMNZ: Gold	Kill 'Em All
"The Four Horsemen"	1983	—	—	—	—	—	—	—	—	—	—	RIAA: Gold	Kill 'Em All
"Ride the Lightning"	1984	—	—	—	—	—	—	—	—	—	—	RIAA: Gold	Ride the Lightning
"Battery"	1986	—	—	—	—	—	—	—	—	—	—	RIAA: Gold; ARIA: Gold; RMNZ: Gold	Master of Puppets
"Welcome Home (Sanitarium)"	1986	—	—	—	—	—	—	—	—	—	—	RIAA: Gold; ARIA: Gold; RMNZ: Gold	Master of Puppets
"Blackened"	1988	—	—	—	—	—	—	—	—	—	—	RIAA: Gold; ARIA: Gold; RMNZ: Gold	…And Justice for All
"Remember Tomorrow"	2008	—	—	32	—	—	—	—	—	—	—		Maiden Heaven: A Tribute to Iron Maiden
"That Was Just Your Life"	2008	—	—	—	—	—	—	16	—	—	—		Death Magnetic
"The Unforgiven III"	2008	14	—	—	41	—	16	8	34	12	120	ARIA: Gold	Death Magnetic
"Hate Train"	2012	—	—	—	—	30	—	—	—	—	—		Beyond Magnetic
"When a Blind Man Cries"	2012	—	22	—	—	—	—	—	—	—	—		Re-Machined: A Tribute to Deep Purple's Machine Head
"Halo on Fire"	2018	—	—	14	—	—	—	—	—	—	—		Hardwired... to Self-Destruct
"—" denotes a recording that did not chart or was not released in that territory.

== Other appearances ==
Song	Year	Album	Ref(s)
"Hit the Lights" (original version, later re-recorded for Kill 'Em All)	1982	Metal Massacre, Vol. 1	
"Stone Cold Crazy"	1990	Rubáiyát: Elektra's 40th Anniversary	
"For Whom the Bell Tolls (The Irony of It All)" (with DJ Spooky)	1997	Spawn: The Album	
"I Disappear"	2000	Mission: Impossible 2	
"We Did It Again" (with Ja Rule)	2002	Swizz Beatz Presents G.H.E.T.T.O. Stories	
"53rd & 3rd"	2003	We're a Happy Family: A Tribute to Ramones	
"The Ecstasy of Gold"	2007	We All Love Ennio Morricone	
"Remember Tomorrow"	2008	Maiden Heaven: A Tribute to Iron Maiden	
"You Really Got Me"	2010	See My Friends	
"When a Blind Man Cries"	2012	Re-Machined: A Tribute To Deep Purple's Machine Head	
"Ronnie Rising Medley"	2014	Ronnie James Dio – This is Your Life	
"Nothing Else Matters – Jungle Cruise Version"	2021	Jungle Cruise (Original Motion Picture Soundtrack)	

== Videos ==
=== Video albums ===
List of video albums, with selected chart positions, sales figures and certifications
Title	Album details	Peak chart positions							Sales	Certifications
Title	Album details	US Video	AUS DVD	CAN Video	FIN DVD	GER	NZ DVD	UK Video	Sales	Certifications
Cliff 'Em All	Released: November 28, 1987; Label: Elektra	20	—	7	—	—	—	—	—	RIAA: 4× Platinum
2 of One	Released: June 6, 1989; Label: Elektra	31	—	—	—	—	—	—	—	RIAA: Platinum
A Year and a Half in the Life of Metallica	Released: November 17, 1992; Label: Elektra	26	—	—	—	—	—	—	—	RIAA: 3× Platinum
Cunning Stunts	Released: December 8, 1998; Label: Elektra	3	1	—	1	—	—	—	FIN: 6,376	RIAA: 3× Platinum; BPI: 2× Platinum; IFPI FIN: Gold; RMNZ: Platinum
S&M (with San Francisco Symphony)	Released: November 23, 1999; Label: Elektra	12	1	—	4	—	—	—	—	RIAA: 6× Platinum; ARIA: 7× Platinum; MC: 3× Platinum; BPI: Platinum
The Videos 1989–2004	Released: December 5, 2006; Label: Warner Bros.	4	1	—	4	34	1	—	FIN: 16,033	ARIA: 7× Platinum; BPI: Platinum; BVMI: Platinum; IFPI FIN: Platinum; MC: Gold; RMNZ: Platinum
Français Pour une Nuit	Released: November 23, 2009; Label: Universal	—	2	—	2	—	—	9		ARIA: Gold
Orgullo, Pasión, y Gloria: Tres Noches en la Ciudad de México	Released: November 30, 2009; Label: Universal	—	—	—	2	—	—	—	—	—
The Big Four: Live from Sofia, Bulgaria (with Slayer, Megadeth and Anthrax)	Released: November 1, 2010; Label: Universal	1	1	—	1	4	1	1		RIAA: 2× Platinum; ARIA: 2× Platinum; BVMI: Gold; RMNZ: Gold
Quebec Magnetic	Released: December 10, 2012; Label: Blackened	3	3	—	1	29	—	9		ARIA: Platinum; BVMI: Gold
"—" denotes a recording that did not chart or was not released in that territory.

=== Music videos ===
List of music videos, with directors, showing year released along with albums
Title	Year	Director(s)	Album
"One"	1989	Bill Pope, Michael Salomon	...And Justice for All
"Enter Sandman"	1991	Wayne Isham	Metallica
"The Unforgiven"	1991	Matt Mahurin	Metallica
"Nothing Else Matters"	1992	Adam Dubin	Metallica
"Wherever I May Roam"	1992	Wayne Isham	Metallica
"Sad but True"	1992	Wayne Isham	Metallica
"Fade to Black (Live)"	1993	Wayne Isham	Live Shit: Binge and Purge
"Until It Sleeps"	1996	Samuel Bayer	Load
"Hero of the Day"	1996	Anton Corbijn	Load
"Mama Said"	1996	Anton Corbijn	Load
"King Nothing"	1997	Matt Mahurin	Load
"The Memory Remains"	1997	Paul Andresen	Reload
"The Unforgiven II"	1998	Matt Mahurin	Reload
"Fuel"	1998	Wayne Isham	Reload
"Turn the Page"	1998	Jonas Åkerlund	Garage, Inc.
"Whiskey in the Jar"	1999	Jonas Åkerlund	Garage, Inc.
"Die, Die My Darling"	1999	Joe Friday	Garage, Inc.
"No Leaf Clover"	1999	Wayne Isham	S&M
"I Disappear"	2000	Wayne Isham	Mission: Impossible 2 soundtrack
"St. Anger"	2003	The Malloys	St. Anger
"Frantic"	2003	Wayne Isham	St. Anger
"The Unnamed Feeling"	2003	The Malloys	St. Anger
"Some Kind of Monster"	2004	Bruce Sinofsky	St. Anger
"Iron Man"	2006	Joel Gallen, Tim Kettle	Rock and Roll Hall of Fame
"The Day That Never Comes"	2008	Peter Hjors, Thomas Vinterberg	Death Magnetic
"All Nightmare Long"	2008	Roboshobo	Death Magnetic
"Broken, Beat & Scarred"	2009	Wayne Isham	Death Magnetic
"Master of Puppets" (Live)	2013	Nimród Antal	Metallica: Through the Never
"Hardwired"	2016	Colin Shane Hakes	Hardwired... to Self Destruct
"Moth into Flame"	2016	Tom Kirk	Hardwired... to Self Destruct
"Atlas, Rise!"	2016	Clark Eddy	Hardwired... to Self Destruct
"Dream No More"	2016	Tom Kirk	Hardwired... to Self Destruct
"Confusion"	2016	Claire Marie Vogel	Hardwired... to Self Destruct
"ManUNkind"	2016	Jonas Åkerlund	Hardwired... to Self Destruct
"Now That We're Dead"	2016	Herring & Herring	Hardwired... to Self Destruct
"Here Comes Revenge"	2016	Jessica Cope	Hardwired... to Self Destruct
"Am I Savage?"	2016	Herring & Herring	Hardwired... to Self Destruct
"Halo on Fire"	2016	Herring & Herring	Hardwired... to Self Destruct
"Murder One"	2016	Robert Valley	Hardwired... to Self Destruct
"Spit Out the Bone"	2016	Phil Mucci	Hardwired... to Self Destruct
"Lords of Summer"	2016	Brett Murray	Hardwired... to Self Destruct
"Now That We're Dead" (second music video)	2017	Brett Murray	Hardwired... to Self Destruct
"Lux Æterna"	2022	Tim Saccenti	72 Seasons
"Screaming Suicide"	2023	Tim Saccenti	72 Seasons
"If Darkness Had a Son"	2023	Tim Saccenti	72 Seasons
"72 Seasons"	2023	Tim Saccenti	72 Seasons
"Sleepwalk My Life Away"	2023	Tim Saccenti	72 Seasons
"Room of Mirrors"	2023	Tristan Zammit	72 Seasons
"Shadows Follow"	2023	Tristan Zammit	72 Seasons
"Too Far Gone?"	2023	Team Rolfes	72 Seasons
"Crown of Barbed Wire"	2023	Corey Daigle	72 Seasons
"Chasing Light"	2023	Kim Asendorf, Dina Chang	72 Seasons
"You Must Burn!"	2023	Tim Saccenti	72 Seasons
"Inamorata"	2023	Jessica Cope	72 Seasons
"Too Far Gone?" (second music video)	2023	Coan “Buddy” Nichols	72 Seasons

== Demos ==
Title	Recorded	Details	Ref(s)
Whiskey Audition Tape	March 1982	These two cover songs were recorded in then-bassist Ron McGovney’s garage, during rehearsals that took place in March 1982. On the strength of this demo tape, Metallica were booked to open for NWOBHM band Saxon on March 27, 1982, at the Los Angeles club Whisky a Go Go.	
Ron McGovney's '82 Garage demo	March 1982	Recorded in McGovney's garage during March 1982. Although the demo has never been officially released, it has been in wide circulation in various bootleg versions.	
Power Metal demo	April 1982	Although the demo has never been officially released, it was given the bootleg name "Power Metal" after the tagline McGovney had printed on Metallica's first business cards. The tape contained four original songs, including two new songs, "The Mechanix", written by Dave Mustaine, and "Motorbreath", written by James Hetfield. It was, like all previous demos, also recorded in McGovney's garage.	
No Life 'Til Leather	July 1982	Metallica's most widely circulated demo tape. All of the tracks are early recordings of songs that would later appear on Kill 'Em All. The title of the demo comes from the first line of "Hit the Lights". The planned expanded release in 2016 was delayed indefinitely following objections from Mustaine over writing credits.	
Metal Up Your Ass	November 1982	Recorded on November 29, 1982, at the Old Waldorf in San Francisco. Features all nine original songs that the band wrote up to that point.	
Megaforce demo			
Ride the Lightning demo	October 1983	Contained all original material Metallica had written that was not released on Kill 'Em All, including the last two tracks that Mustaine wrote.	
Metallica demo	August 1990	Recorded by James and Lars on August 13, 1990, in Lars’ home studio, "The Dungeon". Four of the songs from this particular session were later released as B-sides on various album singles.	
Demo Magnetic	November 2005 – January 2007	Released as a bonus disc under the slogan of a different "experience" version of Death Magnetic.	

== See also ==
- List of songs recorded by Metallica
