= The Videos 1989–2004 =

Video by Metallica
- Released: December 4, 2006
- Genres: Heavy metal; thrash metal; hard rock
- Length: 113:44; 138:38 (with bonus tracks)
- Label: Warner Bros.

Metallica chronology
S&M (1999)	The Videos 1989–2004 (2006)	Français Pour une Nuit (2009)

The Videos 1989–2004 is a video album by American heavy metal band Metallica, released on DVD in December 2006. It features all of the band's videos from 1989 to 2004. In its first week of release, the DVD sold 28,000 copies. The menus of the DVD play excerpts of different Metallica songs, including "The Outlaw Torn" (Load), "My Friend of Misery" (Metallica), "Bleeding Me" (Load), "Carpe Diem Baby" (Reload) and "Prince Charming" (Reload).

The disc has been released by Warner Bros. Records, although this is not mentioned anywhere except for the packaging and on the label of the disc itself. Copyright is given to Elektra Entertainment and E/M Ventures in the liner notes and the end credits of the DVD.

== Track listing ==
The Videos 1989–2004 track listing
No.	Title	Details	Length
1.	"One" (directed by Michael Salomon)	filmed December 1988, premiered January 22, 1989	7:41
2.	"Enter Sandman" (directed by Wayne Isham)	filmed June 1991, premiered July 30, 1991	5:28
3.	"The Unforgiven" (directed by Matt Mahurin)	filmed September 1991, premiered November 19, 1991	6:21
4.	"Nothing Else Matters" (directed by Adam Dubin)	filmed Spring 1991, premiered February 25, 1992	6:24
5.	"Wherever I May Roam" (directed by Wayne Isham)	filmed January and March 1992, premiered May 21, 1992	6:05
6.	"Sad but True" (directed by Wayne Isham)	filmed January 1992, premiered October 5, 1992	5:26
7.	"Until It Sleeps" (directed by Samuel Bayer)	filmed May 1996, premiered May 23, 1996	4:32
8.	"Hero of the Day" (directed by Anton Corbijn)	filmed August 1996, premiered August 21, 1996	4:30
9.	"Mama Said" (directed by Anton Corbijn)	filmed November 1996, did not air in U.S.	4:51
10.	"King Nothing" (directed by Matt Mahurin)	filmed December 1996, premiered January 7, 1997	5:26
11.	"The Memory Remains" (directed by Paul Andresen)	filmed October 1997, premiered November 4, 1997	4:37
12.	"The Unforgiven II" (directed by Matt Mahurin)	filmed December 1997, premiered January 20, 1998	6:33
13.	"Fuel" (directed by Wayne Isham)	filmed May 1998, premiered May 14, 1998	4:35
14.	"Turn the Page" (directed by Jonas Åkerlund)	filmed October 1998, premiered October 28, 1998	5:49
15.	"Whiskey in the Jar" (directed by Jonas Åkerlund)	filmed November 1998, premiered March 16, 1999	4:43
16.	"No Leaf Clover" (directed by Wayne Isham)	filmed April 1999, premiered November 8, 1999	5:33
17.	"I Disappear" (directed by Wayne Isham)	filmed April 2000, premiered May 4, 2000	4:28
18.	"St. Anger" (directed by The Malloys)	filmed May 2003, premiered May 27, 2003	5:50
19.	"Frantic" (directed by Wayne Isham)	filmed July 2003, premiered August 15, 2003	4:55
20.	"The Unnamed Feeling" (directed by The Malloys)	filmed October 2003, premiered December 3, 2003	5:29
21.	"Some Kind of Monster" (directed by Alan Smithee)	filmed 2002–2003, premiere June 28, 2004	4:28
Total length:			1:53:44

=== Bonus tracks ===
No.	Title	Details	Length
21.	"2 of One – Introduction" (directed by Steven Goldmann)	filmed March 1989, premiered June 6, 1989	5:43
23.	"One (Jammin' Version)" (directed by Bill Pope & Mikael Salomon)	filmed December 1988, premiered January 30, 1989	5:05
24.	"The Unforgiven (Theatrical Version)" (directed by Matt Mahurin)	filmed September 1991, premiered November 19, 1991	11:29
25.	"Metallica: Some Kind of Monster – Film Trailer" (directed by Joe Berlinger & Bruce Sinofsky)	filmed 2002–2003, premiere 2004	2:27
Total length:			2:18:28

== Production ==
- Andie Airfix (Satori) – Package Design
- Michael Agel – Band photo
- Mixed at The Document Room, Malibu, CA
- Kevin Shirley – Surround Mix
- Drew Griffiths – Engineer
- Jared Kvitka – Assistant Engineer
- Bob Ludwig (Gateway Mastering) – Surround Audio Mastering
- Ted Jensen (Sterling Sound) – Stereo Audio Mastering
- David May – DVD Producer
- Seann Cowling – DVD Associate Producer
- Raena Winscott – DVD Associate Producer
- Ted Hall (POP Sound) – Post Production Mixer
- Jason Talton (POP Sound) – Assistant Post Production Mixer
- Sean Donnelly – DVD Menu Design
- Jim Atkins (Media Services Group) – DVD Authoring
- Q Prime Inc – Management

== Chart positions ==
Chart (2006)	Peak position
Danish Music DVDs Chart	5
Finnish Music DVDs Chart	1
German Albums Chart	34
Greek Music DVDs Chart	1
Italian Music DVDs Chart	12
Swedish Music DVDs Chart	1
Spanish Music DVDs Chart	2

Chart (2007)	Peak position
Australian Music DVDs Chart	1
Austrian Music DVDs Chart	4
Belgian (Flanders) Music DVDs Chart	3
Dutch Music DVDs Chart	16
Irish Music DVDs Chart	2
New Zealand Music DVDs Chart	1
Norwegian Music DVDs Chart	2
US Music Videos Chart	4

== Certifications ==
Region	Certification	Certified units/sales
Argentina (CAPIF)	Platinum	8,000^{^}
Australia (ARIA)	7× Platinum	105,000^{^}
Finland (Musiikkituottajat)	Platinum	16,033
Germany (BVMI)	Platinum	50,000^{^}
New Zealand (RMNZ)	Platinum	5,000^{^}
Poland (ZPAV)	Gold	5,000^{*}
Spain (Promusicae)	Gold	10,000^{^}
Sweden (GLF)	Gold	10,000^{^}
United Kingdom (BPI)	Platinum	50,000^{*}
^{*} Sales figures based on certification alone.^{^} Shipments figures based on certification alone.
