= Cunning Stunts (video) =

Video by Metallica
- Released: December 8, 1998
- Recorded: May 9–10, 1997
- Venues: Fort Worth Convention Center, Fort Worth, Texas
- Genres: Heavy metal; thrash metal
- Length: 121:35
- Label: Elektra Entertainment
- Director: Wayne Isham
- Producers: Dana Marshall; Joe Plewa

Metallica video chronology
Live Shit: Binge & Purge (1993)	Cunning Stunts (1998)	S&M (1999)

Professional ratings
Review scores
Source	Rating
Allmusic	4.5/5 stars

Cunning Stunts is a live album by heavy metal band Metallica. It was released in 1998 on DVD and VHS formats, and in Japan released on LaserDisc in 1999.

The live footage was filmed on May 9th & 10th of 1997 at Fort Worth Convention Center (which was known as Tarrant County Convention Center) in Fort Worth, Texas during Metallica's 1996-1997 Poor Touring Me Tour (which was in support of Metallica's sixth album, from 1996, entitled Load)

The DVD features concert footage, band interviews, a documentary, behind the scenes footage, and a photo gallery consisting of approximately 1,000 photos taken by Anton Corbijn, some of which were used in the album sleeves for Reload. Three of the performances feature multiple angles.

During the performance of the song "Enter Sandman", the entire stage is set to appear to collapse and explode, with pyrotechnics and a technician (referred to in the extras as the "Burning Dude") who runs across the stage while on fire, as another technician swings overhead.

This is also one of the few Metallica concerts that did not feature "The Ecstasy of Gold" as an intro.

The title is a spoonerism of the words stunning cunts. The band Caravan had already used this title for their 1975 album. The Cows used this title for their 1992 release.

== Track listing ==
=== Disc 1 ===
No.	Title	Length
1.	"Bad Seed Jam"/"So What?"	5:34
2.	"Creeping Death"	6:49
3.	"Sad but True"	6:31
4.	"Ain't My Bitch" (Multiple Angles)	6:27
5.	"Hero of the Day"	4:18
6.	"King Nothing"	5:29
7.	"One"	7:23
8.	"Fuel" (Demo Version)	5:50
9.	"Bass/Guitar Doodle" (Medley of "My Friend of Misery", and "Welcome Home (Sanitarium)")	3:55
10.	"Nothing Else Matters"	6:05
11.	"Until It Sleeps"	4:17
12.	"For Whom the Bell Tolls" (Multiple Angles)	5:51
13.	"Wherever I May Roam" (Multiple Angles)	7:14
14.	"Fade to Black"	8:29
15.	"Kill/Ride Medley: 1: Ride the Lightning; 2: No Remorse; 3: Hit the Lights; 4: The Four Horsemen; 5: Seek & Destroy; 6: Fight Fire with Fire"	16:10
Total length:		1:40:12

=== Disc 2 ===
No.	Title	Length
1.	"Leper Messiah Jam"/"Last Caress"	5:28
2.	"Master of Puppets" (short version)	3:43
3.	"Enter Sandman"	7:36
4.	"Cure Jam"/"Am I Evil?" (short version)	7:04
5.	"Motorbreath"	3:16
Total length:		27:07

== Personnel ==
Metallica

- James Hetfield – vocals, rhythm guitar
- Lars Ulrich – drums
- Kirk Hammett – lead guitar, backing vocals
- Jason Newsted – bass, backing vocals

Production

- Andie Airfix – artwork, design
- Anton Corbijn – photography
- Wayne Isham – director

== Certifications ==
Region	Certification	Certified units/sales
Poland (ZPAV)	Gold	5,000^{*}
United Kingdom (BPI)	2× Platinum	100,000^{^}
^{*} Sales figures based on certification alone.^{^} Shipments figures based on certification alone.
