= S&M (album) =

Live album and video by Metallica and the San Francisco Symphony
- Released: November 23, 1999
- Recorded: April 21–22, 1999
- Venue: Berkeley Community Theatre (Berkeley, California)
- Genres: Heavy metal; symphonic metal; hard rock; thrash metal
- Length: 133:14
- Labels: Elektra; Vertigo
- Producers: James Hetfield; Michael Kamen; Bob Rock; Lars Ulrich

Metallica chronology
Garage Inc. (1998)	S&M (1999)	St. Anger (2003)

Metallica video chronology
Cunning Stunts (1998)	S&M (1999)	The Videos 1989–2004 (2006)

Singles from S&M
- 1. "Nothing Else Matters '99" Released: November 22, 1999; 2. "No Leaf Clover" Released: March 20, 2000

S&M (an abbreviation of Symphony and Metallica) is a live album by American heavy metal band Metallica, accompanied by the San Francisco Symphony conducted by Michael Kamen. It was recorded on April 21 and 22, 1999, at The Berkeley Community Theatre. This is the final Metallica album to feature bassist Jason Newsted.

== Album information ==
S&M contains performances of Metallica songs with additional symphonic accompaniment, composed by Michael Kamen, who also conducted the orchestra during the concert. According to James Hetfield, the idea to combine heavy metal with an epic classical approach was Cliff Burton's idea. His love of classical music, especially of Johann Sebastian Bach, can be found in many instrumental parts and melodic characteristics in Metallica's songwriting, including songs from Ride the Lightning (1984) and Master of Puppets (1986). Kamen, who arranged and conducted the orchestral background tracks for "Nothing Else Matters", met the band at the 1992 Grammy award show for the first time, and after hearing the "Elevator version" of the song, suggested the band perform with a whole orchestra; the band, however, did not take him up on the offer until seven years later.

The approach of mixing a rock band with an orchestra had been taken a number of times before, including by the Moody Blues' Days of Future Passed in 1967, Deep Purple's Concerto for Group and Orchestra in 1969, and Rage's Lingua Mortis in 1996 - an album in collaboration with the Lingua Mortis Orchestra.

In addition to songs from previous albums spanning Ride the Lightning through Reload, there are two new compositions: "No Leaf Clover" and "−Human". "The Ecstasy of Gold" by Ennio Morricone, Metallica's entrance music, was played live by the orchestra. "No Leaf Clover" has since been performed by Metallica in concert, using a recording of the orchestral prelude.

Changes were made to the lyrics of some songs, most notably the removal of the second verse and chorus of "The Thing That Should Not Be" and playing the third verse in its place.

The "S" in the stylized "S&M" on the album cover is a backwards treble clef, while the "M" is taken from Metallica's logo.

== Critical reception ==
Professional ratings
Review scores
Source	Rating
AllMusic	3/5 stars
Collector's Guide to Heavy Metal	5/10
Encyclopedia of Popular Music	2/5 stars
Entertainment Weekly	B
Q	3/5 stars
Rolling Stone	3/5 stars
The Rolling Stone Album Guide	1/5 stars
Spin	8/10

- Rolling Stone (January 20, 2000, pp. 57–59) - 3 stars out of 5 - "...create the most crowded, ceiling-rattling basement rec room in rock....[in its] sheer awesomeness...the live performance succeeded....the monster numbers benefit from supersizing. The effect is more one of timelessness..."
- Spin (February 2000, pp. 114–5) – 8 out of 10 – "...makes their tempo and texture dynamics...into a topic in and off of itself, a deep evocation of bad-voodoo creeping willies culminating in 'One' and 'Enter Sandman'....Freed from ritualized superhuman extremism, it builds a soundtrack to everyday life."
- Entertainment Weekly (December 3, 1999, p. 102) – "Buttressed by grim strings, creaky horns, and thundering timpani, staples...creep with fearful new dimension, like an old Posada print come to life." – Rating: B
- Q (February 2000, p. 86) – 3 stars out of 5 – "...another just about forgivable flirtation with Spinal Tap-esque lunacy....a fine hit-heavy live LP with bolted-on bombast from the S.F. Symphony....Michael Kamen's scores swoop and soar with impressive portent throughout."
- CMJ (December 20, 1999, p. 24) – "...stunning....orchestral renditions of hits from the band's '90s output."
- S&M was included in the book 1001 Albums You Must Hear Before You Die.
- NME ranked the album 48th on its list of 50 Greatest Live Albums.
- Metal Hammer magazine named it one of the 20 best metal albums of 1999.

=== Accolades ===
Year	Winner	Category
1999	S&M	Metal Edge Readers' Choice Award for Compilation Album of the Year
2000	S&M	ARTIST Direct Online Music Award for Favorite Turn-It-Up-Loud CD
2000	S&M	California Music Award for Arthur M. Sohcot Award for Excellence
2001	"The Call of Ktulu"	Grammy Award for Best Rock Instrumental Performance

== Commercial performance ==
S&M sold 300,000 units in the first week of release, and went on to sell a total of 2.5 million copies in the US. As of 2003, the album had been certified 5× platinum.

== 20th anniversary ==
After Kamen's death in 2003, Metallica did not revisit the S&M concept until 2019, when they performed with the San Francisco Symphony, headed by Michael Tilson Thomas, at the Chase Center on the 6th and the 8th of September. The shows included many songs from the original S&M performances, as well as renditions of songs that had been released since then. In August, it was announced that a film of the concerts would receive a limited worldwide theatrical release. The concert was given a limited release and has grossed over 5.5 million dollars. In August 2020, the band released the two 20th anniversary performances as an album, video, and box set entitled S&M2.

== Track listing ==
Disc one
No.	Title	Writer(s)	Original album	Length
1.	"The Ecstasy of Gold" (instrumental)	Ennio Morricone	The Good, the Bad and the Ugly	2:31
2.	"The Call of Ktulu" (instrumental)	James Hetfield, Lars Ulrich, Cliff Burton, Dave Mustaine	Ride the Lightning	9:34
3.	"Master of Puppets"	Hetfield, Ulrich, Burton, Kirk Hammett	Master of Puppets	8:55
4.	"Of Wolf and Man"	Hetfield, Ulrich, Hammett	Metallica	4:19
5.	"The Thing That Should Not Be"	Hetfield, Ulrich, Hammett	Master of Puppets	7:27
6.	"Fuel"	Hetfield, Ulrich, Hammett	Reload	4:36
7.	"The Memory Remains"	Hetfield, Ulrich	Reload	4:42
8.	"No Leaf Clover"	Hetfield, Ulrich	previously unreleased	5:43
9.	"Hero of the Day"	Hetfield, Ulrich, Hammett	Load	4:45
10.	"Devil's Dance"	Hetfield, Ulrich	Reload	5:26
11.	"Bleeding Me"	Hetfield, Ulrich, Hammett	Load	9:02
Total length:				67:00

Disc two
No.	Title	Writer(s)	Original album	Length
1.	"Nothing Else Matters"	Hetfield, Ulrich	Metallica	6:48
2.	"Until It Sleeps"	Hetfield, Ulrich	Load	4:30
3.	"For Whom the Bell Tolls"	Hetfield, Ulrich, Burton	Ride the Lightning	4:52
4.	"– Human"	Hetfield, Ulrich	previously unreleased	4:20
5.	"Wherever I May Roam"	Hetfield, Ulrich	Metallica	7:02
6.	"The Outlaw Torn"	Hetfield, Ulrich	Load	9:59
7.	"Sad but True"	Hetfield, Ulrich	Metallica	5:46
8.	"One"	Hetfield, Ulrich	...And Justice for All	7:53
9.	"Enter Sandman"	Hetfield, Ulrich, Hammett	Metallica	7:39
10.	"Battery"	Hetfield, Ulrich	Master of Puppets	7:25
Total length:				66:14; Overall: 133:14

== Video release ==
Metallica also filmed and released the concert in DVD and VHS with direction by Wayne Isham. The VHS set has only the concert video, while the double DVD set has 5.1 sound (also: 2.0 band+orchestra, 2.0 band-only and 2.0 orchestra-only), 41 minute documentary about the concert, and two "No Leaf Clover" music videos: "Slice & Dice" version and the "Maestro Edit". The DVD also contains four songs with multi-angles where each band member can be viewed individually: "Of Wolf and Man", "Fuel", "Sad But True", and "Enter Sandman".

== Personnel ==
Metallica

- James Hetfield – rhythm guitar, lead vocals, electro-acoustic guitar in "Nothing Else Matters"; first solo in "Master of Puppets", solo on "Nothing Else Matters", outro solo in "The Outlaw Torn"
- Kirk Hammett – lead guitar, backing vocals, electric sitar on "Wherever I May Roam"
- Jason Newsted – bass guitar, backing vocals
- Lars Ulrich – drums

Video production

- Wayne Isham – video director
- Bart Lipton – video producer
- Dana Marshall – video producer

San Francisco Symphony

- Michael Kamen – orchestral arrangements and conducting
- John Kieser – general manager
- Eric Achen, Joshua Garrett, Douglas Hull, Jonathan Ring, Bruce Roberts, Robert Ward, James Smelser – French horns
- David Teie principal, Richard Andaya, Barbara Bogatin, Jill Rachuy Brindel, David Goldblatt – cello
- Jeremy Constant concertmaster, Daniel Banner, Enrique Bocedi, Paul Brancato, Catherine Down, Bruce Freifeld, Connie Gantsweg, Michael Gerling, Frances Jeffrey, Robert Zelnick, Yukiko Kamei, Naomi Kazama, Kum Mo Kim, Yasuko Hattori, Melissa Kleinbart, Mo Kobialka, Daniel Kobialka, Rudolph Kremer, Kelly Leon-Pearce, Diane Nicholeris, Florin Parvulescu, Anne Pinsker, Victor Romasevich, Philip Santos, Peter Shelton – violins
- Chris Bogios, Glenn Fischthal, Andrew McCandless, Craig Morris – trumpets
- Stephen Paulson, Steven Dibner, Rob Weir – bassoons
- Steven Braunstein – contrabassoon
- Charles Chandler, Laurence Epstein, Chris Gilbert, William Ritchen, Stephen Tramontozzi, S. Mark Wright – double basses
- Anthony J. Cirone, Ray Froelich, Thomas Hemphill, Artie Storch – percussion
- Don Ehrlich, Gina Feinauer, David Gaudry, Christina King, Yun Jie Liu, Seth Mausner, Nanci Severance, Geraldine Walther – violas
- John Engelkes, Tom Hornig, Paul Welcomer, Jeff Budin – trombones
- Julie Ann Giacobassi, Eugene Izotov, Pamela Smith – oboes
- Russ deLuna – English horn
- David Herbert – timpani
- Linda Lukas, Tim Day, Robin McKee – flutes
- David Neuman, Carey Bell, Luis Beez – clarinets
- Catherine Payne – piccolo
- Douglas Rioth – harp
- Robin Sutherland – keyboards
- Peter Wahrhaftig – tuba

Technical personnel

- Bob Rock – producer, engineer
- James Hetfield – producer
- Lars Ulrich – producer
- Michael Kamen – producer, orchestration, arranger, liner notes, music director
- Randy Staub – engineer, mixing
- Steve McLaughlin – engineer, recording
- George Marino – mastering
- Billy Bowers – digital editing
- Paul DeCarli – digital editing
- Mike Gillies – digital editing
- Darren Grahn – digital editing, assistant
- John Vrtacic – technical assistance
- James Brett – assistant, music preparation
- Billy Konkel – assistant
- Leff Lefferts – assistant
- Kent Matcke – assistant
- Geoffrey Alexander – orchestration
- Ted Allen – orchestration
- Pete Anthony – orchestration
- Chris Wagner – orchestration
- Bruce Babcock - orchestration
- Chris Boardman – orchestration
- Bob Elhai – orchestration
- Blake Neely – orchestration, music copyist, music preparation
- Jonathan Sacks – orchestration
- Brad Warnaar – orchestration
- Michael Price – music preparation
- Vic Fraser – music copyist
- Andie Airfix – design
- Anton Corbijn – photography

== Chart positions ==
=== Weekly charts ===
Weekly chart performance for S&M
Chart (1999–2000)	Peak position
Australian Albums (ARIA)	1
Austrian Albums (Ö3 Austria)	3
Belgian Albums (Ultratop Flanders)	4
Belgian Albums (Ultratop Wallonia)	16
Danish Albums (Hitlisten)	3
Dutch Albums (Album Top 100)	2
Europe (European Top 100 Albums)	2
Finnish Albums (Suomen virallinen lista)	2
French Albums (SNEP)	7
German Albums (Offizielle Top 100)	1
Hungarian Albums (MAHASZ)	25
Irish Albums (IRMA)	42
Italian Albums (Musica e Dischi)	26
Mexican Albums (Top 100 Mexico)	55
New Zealand Albums (RMNZ)	11
Norwegian Albums (VG-lista)	1
Portuguese Albums (AFP)	1
Scottish Albums (Official Charts)	28
Spanish Albums (AFYVE)	6
Swedish Albums (Sverigetopplistan)	1
Swiss Albums (Schweizer Hitparade)	4
UK Albums (Official Charts)	33
US Billboard 200	2

Chart (2020)	Peak position
Polish Albums (ZPAV)	1

=== Year-end charts ===
1999 year-end chart performance for S&M
Chart (1999)	Position
Australian Albums (ARIA)	42
Belgian Albums (Ultratop Flanders)	58
Danish Albums (Hitlisten)	96
Dutch Albums (Album Top 100)	54
German Albums (Offizielle Top 100)	89

2000 year-end chart performance for S&M
Chart (2000)	Position
Austrian Albums (Ö3 Austria)	18
Belgian Albums (Ultratop Flanders)	29
Belgian Albums (Ultratop Wallonia)	62
Canadian Albums (Nielsen SoundScan)	112
Danish Albums (Hitlisten)	50
Dutch Albums (Album Top 100)	23
European Albums (Music & Media)	23
German Albums (Offizielle Top 100)	8
South Korean International Albums (MIAK)	32
Swiss Albums (Schweizer Hitparade)	17
US Billboard 200	30

2020 year-end chart performance for S&M
Chart (2020)	Position
Polish Albums (ZPAV)	27

2021 year-end chart performance for S&M
Chart (2021)	Position
Polish Albums (ZPAV)	36

=== Singles ===
Year	Single	Chart	Position
1999	"No Leaf Clover"	Mainstream Rock Tracks	1
1999	"No Leaf Clover"	Modern Rock Tracks	18
2000	"No Leaf Clover"	Billboard Hot 100	74

== Certifications and sales ==
Certifications and sales for S&M
Region	Certification	Certified units/sales
Argentina (CAPIF)	Platinum	60,000^{^}
Australia (ARIA)	3× Platinum	210,000^{‡}
Austria (IFPI Austria)	Platinum	50,000^{*}
Belgium (BRMA)	Platinum	50,000^{*}
Canada (Music Canada)	3× Platinum	300,000^{^}
Denmark	—	23,262
Finland (Musiikkituottajat)	Platinum	72,831
France (SNEP)	Gold	100,000^{*}
Germany (BVMI)	5× Gold	750,000^{‡}
Greece (IFPI Greece)	Platinum	30,000^{^}
Mexico (AMPROFON)	Gold	75,000^{^}
Netherlands (NVPI)	Platinum	100,000^{^}
New Zealand (RMNZ)	2× Platinum	30,000^{^}
Poland (ZPAV)	2× Platinum	200,000^{*}
Spain (Promusicae)	Platinum	100,000^{^}
Sweden (GLF)	Platinum	80,000^{^}
Switzerland (IFPI Switzerland)	2× Platinum	100,000^{^}
United Kingdom (BPI)	Platinum	300,000^{‡}
United States (RIAA)	5× Platinum	2,500,000^{^}
Summaries
Europe (IFPI)	2× Platinum	2,000,000^{*}
^{*} Sales figures based on certification alone.^{^} Shipments figures based on certification alone.^{‡} Sales+streaming figures based on certification alone.

Certifications and sales for the video release
Region	Certification	Certified units/sales
Australia (ARIA)	7× Platinum	105,000^{^}
Austria (IFPI Austria)	Gold	5,000^{*}
Brazil (Pro-Música Brasil)	Platinum	50,000^{*}
France (SNEP)	Platinum	20,000^{*}
United Kingdom (BPI)	Platinum	50,000^{*}
United States (RIAA)	6× Platinum	600,000^{^}
^{*} Sales figures based on certification alone.^{^} Shipments figures based on certification alone.
