= I Disappear =

2000 single by Metallica

- Cover art of the single

Single by Metallica

from the album Mission: Impossible 2
- Released: June 2, 2000
- Genre: Hard rock; heavy metal; nu metal
- Length: 4:26
- Label: Hollywood
- Songwriters: James Hetfield; Lars Ulrich
- Producers: James Hetfield; Bob Rock; Lars Ulrich

Metallica singles chronology
| "No Leaf Clover" (2000) | "I Disappear" (2000) | "St. Anger" (2003) |

Music video
- "I Disappear" on YouTube

"I Disappear" is a song by American heavy metal band Metallica, released on June 2, 2000 as the lead single from the Mission: Impossible 2 soundtrack. The music and lyrics were written by James Hetfield and Lars Ulrich, and they were joined by Bob Rock to produce the song. The song's leak on the file-sharing service Napster prompted the band to sue the service. The soundtrack single was released on June 2, 2000; while only officially released in Germany, it reached the top ten on charts in seven countries, and went to number one on Billboard's Mainstream Rock chart.

== Composition ==
James Hetfield and Lars Ulrich wrote the music and lyrics for "I Disappear". The song is in the key of E♭ minor, with a "moderate" tempo of 124 beats per minute; the vocals range from E4–G5, while the first guitar ranges from E3–B5. Hetfield, Ulrich, and Bob Rock were producers for the song.

== Music video ==
Wayne Isham directed the music video for "I Disappear". He created four "mini-movies within the video", following each band member through a narrative. Released on May 4, 2000, Isham also incorporated clips of Tom Cruise into the video, tying it into Mission: Impossible 2 and that franchise's star.

Most of the video was shot in Monument Valley atop a sandstone butte on April 13, 2000. After accessing the butte by helicopter, Metallica and their instruments were alone on the plateau, circled by filming aircraft, for over twelve hours. By the end of the shoot, winds were so severe that the drum kit was blown over, footage of which appears in the video. Ulrich was later filmed on a skyscraper in Downtown Los Angeles for "action sequences, explosions, chaos and mayhem".

The music video also featured a 1967 Chevrolet Camaro driven by Metallica band member James Hetfield. Hetfield was given the car after filming, and in 2003, listed it on eBay. With 77,000 miles (124,000 km) on the odometer, the restored two-door car had an automatic transmission and was bidding at US$70,100 (equivalent to $122,688 in 2025) with seven days remaining in the auction; proceeds from the sale were earmarked for music education programs.

== Release ==
While still working on the song, Metallica learned in 2000 that a pre-release version was being aired on US radio stations. The band traced the source of the song to the peer-to-peer file sharing service Napster. After finding their entire catalog available on Napster, they became the first musicians to file lawsuit against the service (Metallica v. Napster, Inc.). As of April 2025, "I Disappear" was available for streaming via the Napster streaming music service.

Performances of "I Disappear" as of October 16, 2024

Metallica performed "I Disappear" 94 times from June 3, 2000, through May 17, 2023.

"I Disappear" was formally released with the Mission: Impossible 2 soundtrack on May 9, 2000. The single was released as a CD maxi on June 2, 2000, under the Hollywood Records label. In Belgium and Italy, the song was released by Edel-Mega Records. Only in Germany was "I Disappear" officially released as a single. In the chronology of Metallica singles, "I Disappear" was released between "No Leaf Clover" (March 20, 2000) and "St. Anger" (June 23, 2003).

The sheet music, published by Universal Music Publishing, was also released in 2000, and spanned 14 pages. The sheet-music publishing website categorizes "I Disappear" as hard rock and heavy metal.

On April 23, 2021, Metallica released the two-track Disappear (Leaked and Live) through their Vinyl Club. The first song is "I Disappear (Leaked Napster Version)", and the second is "I Disappear (Live)", a live performance recorded at the West Hollywood House of Blues on July 18, 2000.

== Critical reception ==
Music critic Mike McGuirk of the San Francisco Bay Guardian described "I Disappear" as leaning on a reworking of "Enter Sandman" with an incorporation of some grunge aesthetic. He said that following Metallica's Load, which he called their "country record", this new song with a "mega" riff and "catchy as hell" melodic choruses proved that the band was not afraid to change things up.

In 2020, Loudwire published their ranking of all extant Metallica songs, listing "I Disappear" at number 26, saying it "[holds] up alongside the highlights of The Black Album. In 2024, Holiday Kirk of The Nu Metal Agenda ranked "I Disappear" 91st in a list of the 100 greatest nu metal songs of all time, calling the band's first foray into the genre, "a summer blockbuster of a single." That same year, WMMR's Erica Banas listed the "undeniable hard rock treasure" as Metallica's thirteenth best song, and attributed part of the song's longevity to "Hetfield's 'Hey, hey, hey' hook and Lars Ulrich's chugging drums on the chorus."

== Track listing ==
The CD maxi single release of "I Disappear" has only two tracks, the title song and its instrumental version.

All tracks are written by James Hetfield and Lars Ulrich.

"I Disappear" CD maxi single track listing
| No. | Title | Producer | Length |
|---|---|---|---|
| 1. | "I Disappear" | Hetfield, Ulrich, and Bob Rock | 4:26 |
| 2. | "I Disappear (Instrumental)" | Hetfield, Ulrich, and Bob Rock | 4:26 |
| Total length: | | | 8:52 |

== Charts ==
=== Weekly charts ===
Weekly chart performance for "I Disappear"
| Chart (2000) | Peak position |
|---|---|
| Austria (Ö3 Austria Top 40) | 25 |
| Belgium (Ultratip Bubbling Under Flanders) | 12 |
| Belgium (Ultratip Bubbling Under Wallonia) | 15 |
| Canada Rock/Alternative (RPM) | 11 |
| Europe (Eurochart Hot 100) | 22 |
| Finland (Suomen virallinen lista) | 2 |
| France (SNEP) | 45 |
| Germany (GfK) | 14 |
| Greece (IFPI) | 6 |
| Ireland (IRMA) | 31 |
| Italy (FIMI) | 8 |
| Netherlands (Dutch Top 40 Tipparade) | 2 |
| Netherlands (Single Top 100) | 36 |
| Norway (VG-lista) | 8 |
| Scottish Singles Sales (Official Charts) | 25 |
| Spain (Promusicae) | 4 |
| Sweden (Sverigetopplistan) | 25 |
| Switzerland (Schweizer Hitparade) | 20 |
| UK Rock & Metal (Official Charts) | 2 |
| UK Singles (Official Charts) | 35 |
| US Billboard Hot 100 | 76 |
| US Alternative Airplay (Billboard) | 11 |
| US Mainstream Rock Airplay (Billboard) | 1 |

=== Year-end charts ===
Year-end chart performance for "I Disappear"
| Chart (2000) | Position |
|---|---|
| US Mainstream Rock Tracks (Billboard) | 3 |
| US Modern Rock Tracks (Billboard) | 36 |

== Certifications ==
Certifications for "I Disappear"
| Region | Certification | Certified units/sales |
|---|---|---|
| Finland (Musiikkituottajat) | Gold | 5,641 |
| Sweden (GLF) | Gold | 15,000^{^} |
| United States (RIAA) | Gold | 500,000^{‡} |
^{^} Shipments figures based on certification alone.^{‡} Sales+streaming figures based on certification alone.
