= 2 of One =

- Cover art by Pushead

Video by Metallica
- Released: June 6, 1989
- Genre: Thrash metal
- Label: Elektra

Metallica chronology
Cliff 'Em All (1987)	2 of One (1989)	A Year and a Half in the Life of Metallica (1992)

2 of One is a video album by American heavy metal band Metallica. It was released on June 6, 1989, through Elektra Entertainment and features two versions of the group's first music video, "One", from their fourth studio album ...And Justice for All.

The music video was directed by Bill Pope and Michael Salomon and was filmed in Los Angeles, California. It features clips from Dalton Trumbo's anti-war film Johnny Got His Gun (1971). All parts of 2 of One are included on the DVD The Videos 1989–2004, released in 2006.

== Track listing ==
No.	Title	Length
1.	"Introduction" (Interview with Lars Ulrich; directed by Steve Goldmann)	5:43
2.	"Original version"	7:46
3.	"Jammin' Version"	5:27
Total length:		18:56

== Certifications ==
Region	Certification	Certified units/sales
United States (RIAA)	Platinum	100,000^{^}
^{^} Shipments figures based on certification alone.
