= Mama Said (Metallica song) =

1996 single by Metallica

Single by Metallica

from the album Load
- B-side: "Ain't My Bitch" (live)
- Released: November 25, 1996
- Genre: Country rock; outlaw country; southern rock; blues; blues-rock
- Length: 5:20
- Label: Elektra
- Composers: James Hetfield; Lars Ulrich
- Lyricist: James Hetfield
- Producers: Bob Rock; James Hetfield; Lars Ulrich

Metallica singles chronology
"Hero of the Day" (1996)	"Mama Said" (1996)	"King Nothing" (1997)

Music video
- "Mama Said" on YouTube

"Mama Said" is a song by American heavy metal band Metallica. A country and Southern rock ballad, it was released as the third single from the band's sixth studio album, Load, on November 25, 1996. The song features personal lyrics written by James Hetfield and music composed by Hetfield and Lars Ulrich.

== Background ==
"Mama Said" was written by James Hetfield and Lars Ulrich. Musically, it is a country rock and southern rock ballad. Its lyrics are about the death of Hetfield's mother. The song and fellow Load track "Wasting My Hate" were inspired by Hetfield's friendship with the country singer-songwriter Waylon Jennings.

The song was released as the third single from Load on November 25, 1996. The music video for the song was directed by Anton Corbijn. It features Hetfield playing the song on an acoustic guitar, sitting alone in the back seat of a car. He travels down a metaphorical highway while the other three members peer at him through the windows. At the end, it is revealed that it was a back-seat studio prop, after which Hetfield and a white horse walk off-screen.

== Track listings ==
International single part 1

1. "Mama Said" – 5:19
2. "King Nothing (Live – Irvine Meadows, California 4 August 1996)" – 6:50
3. "Whiplash (Live – Irvine Meadows, California 4 August 1996)" – 4:52
4. "Mama Said (Edit)" – 4:34

International single part 2

1. "Mama Said" – 5:19
2. "So What (Live – Irvine Meadows, California 4 August 1996)" – 3:00
3. "Creeping Death (Live – Irvine Meadows, California 4 August 1996)" – 7:15
4. "Mama Said (Early Demo Version)" – 6:52

International 7-inch vinyl single

1. "Mama Said" – 5:19
2. "Ain't My Bitch (Live – Irvine Meadows, California 4 August 1996)" – 5:59

Australian maxi single

1. "Mama Said (Edit)" – 4:34
2. "Mama Said (Early Demo Version)" – 6:52

Japanese EP

1. "Mama Said (Edit)" – 4:42
2. "So What (Live – Irvine Meadows, California 4 August 1996)" – 2:58
3. "Creeping Death (Live – Irvine Meadows, California 4 August 1996)" – 7:14
4. "King Nothing (Live – Irvine Meadows, California 4 August 1996)" – 6:51
5. "Whiplash (Live – Irvine Meadows, California 4 August 1996)" – 6:01
6. "Mama Said (Early Demo Version)" – 6:53

== Personnel ==
Personnel are adapted from Benoît Clerc.

Metallica

- James Hetfield – vocals, acoustic guitar, pedal steel guitar
- Kirk Hammett – electric guitar
- Jason Newsted – bass
- Lars Ulrich – drums

Additional musician

- Jim McGillveray – tambourine

== Charts ==
Weekly chart performance for "Mama Said"
Chart (1996–1997)	Peak position
Australia (ARIA)	24
Finland (Suomen virallinen lista)	4
Ireland (IRMA)	19
Netherlands (Single Top 100)	58
Norway (VG-lista)	13
Scottish Singles Sales (Official Charts)	19
Sweden (Sverigetopplistan)	24
UK Singles (Official Charts)	19
UK Rock & Metal (Official Charts)	1

== Certifications ==
Certifications for "Mama Said"
Region	Certification	Certified units/sales
Australia (ARIA)	Gold	35,000^{‡}
^{‡} Sales+streaming figures based on certification alone.
