= Ain't My Bitch =

Promotional single by Metallica

from the album Load
- Released: 1996
- Genre: Hard rock
- Length: 5:04
- Label: Mercury
- Composers: James Hetfield; Lars Ulrich
- Lyricist: James Hetfield
- Producers: Bob Rock; James Hetfield; Lars Ulrich

Metallica promotional singles chronology
"Don't Tread on Me" (1991)	"Ain't My Bitch" (1996)	"Bleeding Me" (1997)

"Ain't My Bitch" is a song by American heavy metal band Metallica that appears as the opening track on their sixth studio album, Load (1996). Written by frontman James Hetfield, with drummer Lars Ulrich co-composing and the two producing with Bob Rock, the song incorporates influences from Southern rock and alternative rock. It has also a country-influenced guitar solo.

It was released as a promotional single in Mexico, but only charted in the US, where the song peaked at No. 15 on Billboard's Mainstream Rock chart. Despite this, "Ain't My Bitch" became a live staple on the band's Poor Touring Me world tour, but was last played in 1998.

== Composition and lyrics ==
With a "hard rocking groove", "Ain't My Bitch" is the closest song on Load to the thrash metal style of the band's early days. Despite this, it incorporates influences from 1970s Southern rock and 1990s alternative rock. The song is a mid-tempo "hard rocker", with wallowing bass, piercing cymbals and high-hats, and an "industrial tone" on the guitars. Lead guitarist Kirk Hammett down-tuned to E♭ tuning, and used a slide on the song's country-influenced guitar solo, a first for Metallica.

The title and lyrics of "Ain't My Bitch" were thought to be misogynistic by some. Frontman James Hetfield explained that the 'bitch' in the song does not refer to a woman, but acts as a metaphor for an obstacle or complaint, as exemplified by the lyric "it ain't my fall, it ain't my call, it ain't my bitch."

== Release ==
"Ain't My Bitch" was released as a promotional single in 1996. The CD was issued by Mercury Records, instead of Elektra Records, who distributed the album, and only in Mexico. Despite this, the song got airplay in other countries, such as the US, where it peaked at No. 15 on Billboard's Mainstream Rock chart. It was Metallica's first promotional single to do so.

== Critical reception ==
Chad Bowar of Ultimate Metallica praised the song's "punch and attitude", while Melinda Newman of Billboard described "Ain't My Bitch" as "hard and crunchy". Drew Millard of Pitchfork called the song "comically distasteful" and mocked Hetfield for "taking great pains to never pronounce it the same way twice. In the first chorus it's 'biiiiii-tchah," while in the second chorus "he goes 'betch-yah.'"

Loudwire placed the song at No. 46 on their ranking of every Metallica song and opined it "sounded like Lynyrd Skynyrd on steroids", adding that "had they released this as the first Load single, the media narrative around the band's post-Black Album return might have been a lot different." On another Loudwire list, "Ranking the Opening Song on Every Metallica Album", the song was ranked at No. 10, with Phillip Trapp labeling it "marginally better than 'That Was Just Your Life' as an album opener" and that it "gives Load its gritty first song to show Metallica can still rock".

== Live performances ==
Upon the release of Load on June 4, 1996, "Ain't My Bitch" quickly became a staple in the band's live set, and was featured regularly during the Poor Touring Me world tour, as seen in the live video Cunning Stunts (1998). The song was first played in Sacramento, California on June 4, 1996 and last played in Wellington, New Zealand on April 17, 1998. As of 2025, it has yet to since be included in the band's setlist rotation.

== Personnel ==
Credits are adapted from Load liner notes, except where noted.

Metallica

- James Hetfield – guitar, vocals
- Kirk Hammett – guitar, slide guitar solo
- Jason Newsted – bass
- Lars Ulrich – drums

Additional musician

- Jim McGillveray – percussion

== Charts ==
Chart (1996)	Peak position
Canada Rock/Alternative (RPM)	8
US Mainstream Rock (Billboard)	15
