= No Leaf Clover =

Single by Metallica and the San Francisco Symphony

from the album S&M
- B-side: "One" (S&M version) "Enter Sandman" (S&M version)
- Released: March 20, 2000
- Recorded: April 21–22, 1999
- Venue: Berkeley Community Theatre (Berkeley, California)
- Genre: Symphonic metal
- Length: 5:43
- Label: Elektra
- Songwriters: James Hetfield; Lars Ulrich
- Producers: Metallica; Bob Rock

Metallica singles chronology
"Nothing Else Matters '99" (1999)	"No Leaf Clover" (2000)	"I Disappear" (2000)

Music video
- "No Leaf Clover" on YouTube

"No Leaf Clover" is the eighth song on the live album S&M by Metallica and the San Francisco Symphony. The song (along with "–Human") was one of two new pieces completed for the band's collaboration with the San Francisco Symphony in 1999. It begins with an intro section played by the orchestra, before entering into a clean guitar part by James Hetfield. The rest of the piece alternates between clean choruses and verses backed by heavily distorted guitars. Nowadays when the song is performed live, the orchestra backing track or footage of the S&M performance is used for the orchestra intro.

It was the band's fourth No. 1 hit on the Billboard Hot Mainstream Rock Tracks chart. It stayed at No. 1 for seven consecutive weeks. It was also featured in the trailer created by the distributor A.D. Vision for their DVD releases of the TV series Farscape.

"No Leaf Clover" is featured as a playable track in the 2009 music game Guitar Hero: Metallica.

== Single track listing ==
=== Australian version ===
1. "No Leaf Clover" (Hetfield, Ulrich) – 5:43
2. "One" (Hetfield, Ulrich) – 7:47
3. "Enter Sandman" (Hammett, Hetfield, Ulrich) – 7:11
4. "No Leaf Clover" (video) (Hetfield, Ulrich) – 5:46
5. "S&M Documentary" (video) – 35:49

All tracks are from the album S&M.

=== UK version #1 ===
1. "No Leaf Clover" (Hetfield, Ulrich) – 5:43
  - "No Leaf Clover" ("Slice & Dice video") – 5:37
  - S&M Documentary Part 1 – 11:24

=== UK version #2 ===
1. "No Leaf Clover" (Hetfield, Ulrich) – 5:43
  - Photo gallery/album lyrics
  - S&M Documentary Part 2 – 17:13

=== UK version #3 ===
1. "No Leaf Clover" (Hetfield, Ulrich) – 5:43
  - Metallica screensaver
  - S&M Documentary Part 3 – 16:43

== Music video ==
The music video for the song, directed by Wayne Isham and filmed in April 1999 in Berkeley, California. It premiered on November 8, 1999.

== Charts ==
=== Weekly chart ===
Chart (2000)	Peak position
Australia (ARIA)	41
Canada Rock/Alternative (RPM)	3
Germany (GfK)	40
Ireland (IRMA)	36
Netherlands (Single Top 100)	41
Norway (VG-lista)	9
Spain (Promusicae)	14
Sweden (Sverigetopplistan)	50
Switzerland (Schweizer Hitparade)	99
US Billboard Hot 100	74
US Alternative Airplay (Billboard)	18
US Mainstream Rock (Billboard)	1

=== Year-end chart ===
Chart (2000)	Position
US Mainstream Rock Tracks (Billboard)	2
US Modern Rock Tracks (Billboard)	53

== Release history ==
Region	Date	Format	Label
Australia	March 13, 2000	CD	Elektra
Europe	March 20, 2000	CD	Elektra
