= Until It Sleeps =

Single by Metallica

from the album Load
- B-side: "Overkill"
- Released: May 20, 1996
- Genre: Alternative rock
- Length: 4:30
- Label: Elektra; Vertigo
- Composers: James Hetfield; Lars Ulrich
- Lyricist: James Hetfield
- Producers: Bob Rock; James Hetfield; Lars Ulrich

Metallica singles chronology
"Sad but True" (1993)	"Until It Sleeps" (1996)	"Hero of the Day" (1996)

Music video
- "Until It Sleeps" on YouTube

"Until It Sleeps" is a song by American heavy metal band Metallica. It was released on May 20, 1996 by Elektra and Vertigo Records, as the lead single from their sixth studio album, Load (1996). "Until It Sleeps" reached number 10 on the US Billboard Hot 100, making it Metallica's highest-charting single and only top-10 hit in the United States. The song also topped the Billboard Mainstream Rock Tracks chart and charted at number 34 on the US Cash Box Top 100. It entered the top five in the United Kingdom, and reached number one in Australia, Denmark, Finland, Hungary, and Sweden. The song's music video, directed by Samuel Bayer and inspired by the paintings of Hieronymus Bosch, won the Best Hard Rock Video award at the 1996 MTV Video Music Awards. The song is dedicated to James Hetfield's mother, Cynthia Bassett.

== Versions ==
Unlike the rest of Load, this song was written as a jam in the studio while recording the basic tracks, according to drummer Lars Ulrich; it was the last song developed for the project.

An early demo version of this song was developed entitled "F.O.B.D." (recorded on December 8, 1995) because it reminded the band members of the Soundgarden song "Fell on Black Days", in that the "It grips you...It stains you..." refrain is in the same 6/4 time signature that "Fell on Black Days" is in. The band can be heard saying "Fell on Black Days" on the fanclub-only Fancan 1 CD just prior to jamming on a portion of "Until It Sleeps", and also featured on one of the two CD single releases.

The 10-inch vinyl version of the single is red in color and featured a B-side industrial-sounding remix by Moby, credited as "Herman Melville". In April 2025, this remix, as well as the "F.O.B.D." version and a 1996 live version, were re-released with a re-mastered version as a digital single ahead of the June 2025 reissue of Load.

The song was performed with orchestral accompaniment on the album S&M, and a live version featured on the Cunning Stunts video release in 1998.

"Until It Sleeps" became the first "officially" pirated MP3 when it was released by Compress 'Da Audio (a piracy group and spinoff of the Warez scene) via an Internet Relay Chat network on August 10, 1996. An EFnet member on the #mpeg3 IRC channel named Coyote666 was responsible for creating the first mp3 ripping software.

== Lyrics ==
While many listeners interpret Metallica's "Until It Sleeps" as being about James Hetfield's mother's battle with cancer, James himself has stated that the song is not solely about that experience. He has indicated it's about pain and grief in general, and some interpret it as reflecting his personal struggles with addiction and trauma. The lyrics of the song, can be seen as either describing emotional pain or loss, or the physical pain.

Both of his parents were Christian Scientists, and did not believe in medicine. The lyrics are also interpreted as dealing with anger issues. Hetfield's father, Virgil, died in late 1996, during Metallica's Load tour.

== Music video ==
The song also has a music video directed by American director Samuel Bayer (Nirvana, Green Day, the Smashing Pumpkins). It was shot in various locations around Los Angeles on May 6 and 7 in 1996. It was premiered by MTV on May 21. The video depicts surreal concepts dealing with the fall of man, taken from various paintings by Hieronymus Bosch. Apart from the general forms inspired from Bosch's paintings, the prominent figures in the video are the human-eating monster from The Garden of Earthly Delights, the fall of Adam and Eve from Haywain and Christ in the Crucifige Eum (Crucify Him) scene of Ecce Homo. The video won the MTV Video Music Award for Best Rock Video in 1996.

== Awards ==
The song won a 1996 Metal Edge Readers' Choice Award for Song of the Year.

== Track listings ==
US CD single
No.	Title	Length
1.	"Until It Sleeps"	4:33
2.	"Overkill"	4:07

UK and European CD1
No.	Title	Length
1.	"Until It Sleeps"	4:33
2.	"2 X 4" (live at Castle Donington, England)	6:06
3.	"F.O.B.D." (aka Until It Sleeps – early 'writing in progress' version)	4:56

UK and European CD2
No.	Title	Length
1.	"Until It Sleeps"
2.	"Kill/Ride Medley" (live at Castle Donington, England)
3.	"Until It Sleeps" (Herman Melville mix)

Japanese EP
No.	Title	Length
1.	"Until It Sleeps"
2.	"Until It Sleeps" (Herman Melville Mix)
3.	"Kill/Ride Medley" (live at Castle Donington, England)
4.	"2 X 4" (live at Castle Donington, England)
5.	"Overkill" (live at the Plant Studios in Sausalito, California)
6.	"F.O.B.D." (aka Until It Sleeps – early 'writing in progress' version)

== Personnel ==
Personnel taken from the album's liner notes, except where noted.

- James Hetfield – guitars, vocals
- Kirk Hammett – guitars
- Jason Newsted – fretless bass
- Lars Ulrich – drums

== Charts ==
=== Weekly charts ===
Chart (1996)	Peak position
Australia (ARIA)	1
Austria (Ö3 Austria Top 40)	12
Belgium (Ultratop 50 Flanders)	8
Belgium (Ultratop 50 Wallonia)	16
Canada Top Singles (RPM)	5
Canada Rock/Alternative (RPM)	6
Canada (Nielsen SoundScan)	21
Canada Hit Parade (The Record)	23
Croatia (HRT)	3
Czech Republic (IFPI CR)	3
Denmark (IFPI)	1
Estonia (Eesti Top 20)	4
Europe (European Hit Radio)	16
Europe (Eurochart Hot 100)	4
Europe Alternative Rock Radio (Music & Media)	11
Finland (Suomen virallinen lista)	1
France (SNEP)	10
Germany (GfK)	15
Hungary (Mahasz)	1
Iceland (Íslenski Listinn Topp 40)	4
Ireland (IRMA)	3
Israel (Israeli Singles Chart)	3
Italy (Musica e dischi)	7
Latvia (Latvijas Top 40)	5
Lithuania (M-1)	8
Netherlands (Dutch Top 40)	9
Netherlands (Single Top 100)	5
New Zealand (Recorded Music NZ)	11
Norway (VG-lista)	2
Quebec (ADISQ)	6
Poland Airplay (Music & Media)	2
Scottish Singles Sales (Official Charts)	3
Spain (AFYVE)	16
Sweden (Sverigetopplistan)	1
Switzerland (Schweizer Hitparade)	22
UK Singles (Official Charts)	5
UK Rock & Metal (Official Charts)	1
UK Singles (GfK Chart-Track)	2
US Billboard Hot 100	10
US Alternative Airplay (Billboard)	27
US Mainstream Rock Airplay (Billboard)	1
US Cash Box Top 100	34

=== Year-end charts ===
Chart (1996)	Position
Australia (ARIA)	44
Belgium (Ultratop 50 Flanders)	71
Belgium (Ultratop 50 Wallonia)	76
Canada Top Singles (RPM)	61
Europe (Eurochart Hot 100)	68
Iceland (Íslenski Listinn Topp 40)	47
Netherlands (Single Top 100)	83
Sweden (Topplistan)	23
US Billboard Hot 100	92
US Mainstream Rock Tracks (Billboard)	3

== Certifications ==
Region	Certification	Certified units/sales
Australia (ARIA)	Platinum	70,000^{‡}
New Zealand (RMNZ)	Gold	5,000^{*}
Norway (IFPI Norway)	Gold	
Sweden (GLF)	Gold	25,000^{^}
United States (RIAA)	Gold	500,000
^{*} Sales figures based on certification alone.^{^} Shipments figures based on certification alone.^{‡} Sales+streaming figures based on certification alone.

== Release history ==
Region	Date	Format(s)	Label(s)	Ref.
United Kingdom	May 20, 1996	10-inch vinyl; CD	Vertigo	
United States	May 21, 1996	CD; cassette	Elektra	
Japan	July 3, 1996	CD	Sony	
