= King Nothing =

Single by Metallica

from the album Load
- B-side: "Ain't My Bitch (live)"
- Released: January 7, 1997
- Genre: Heavy metal
- Length: 5:28
- Label: Elektra
- Composers: James Hetfield; Lars Ulrich; Kirk Hammett
- Lyricist: James Hetfield
- Producers: Bob Rock; James Hetfield; Lars Ulrich

Metallica singles chronology
"Mama Said" (1996)	"King Nothing" (1997)	"Bleeding Me" (1997)

Music video
- "King Nothing" on YouTube

Audio sample
- King Nothing: file; help

"King Nothing" is a song by American heavy metal band Metallica. It was released as the fourth and last single from the band's sixth studio album, Load (1996), on January 7, 1997.

The song was written by James Hetfield, Lars Ulrich, and Kirk Hammett. The song starts on a bass riff which develops into the main riff of the song. A single of "King Nothing" was released in the United States. It included a live version of the song "Ain't My Bitch", which is also on the album Load. A music video also accompanied the song. The guitars and bass are both tuned to Eb.

The words "Off to never-never land", heard at the end of the song, are a nod to the song "Enter Sandman", from Metallica's preceding album, which also contains these words.

On the US charts, the song peaked at No. 6 and No. 90 on Billboard's Mainstream Rock and Hot 100 charts, respectively.

== Music video ==
The music video, directed by Matt Mahurin, was filmed in Salt Lake City, Utah, in December 1996. It premiered on January 7, 1997.

In the music video, "King Nothing" is seen wandering around a snowy wasteland, throwing away his crown, and then putting another one on. He does this so much that by the end of the video, there are crowns everywhere. At the very end, hundreds of other King Nothings surround him.

== Track listing ==
All lyrics are written by James Hetfield.

Canada and US single
No.	Title	Music	Length
1.	"King Nothing"	Hetfield; Lars Ulrich; Kirk Hammett	5:28
2.	"Ain't My Bitch" (Live – Irvine Meadows, California, 4 August 1996)	Hetfield; Ulrich	6:00

US promo Single
No.	Title	Music	Length
1.	"King Nothing" (edited version)	Hetfield; Ulrich; Hammett	4:59
2.	"King Nothing" (full version)	Hetfield; Ulrich; Hammett	5:28

== Personnel ==
Credits taken from the album's liner notes, except where noted.

Metallica

- James Hetfield – guitars, vocals
- Kirk Hammett – guitars
- Jason Newsted – bass
- Lars Ulrich – drums

Additional musician

- Jim McGillveray – shaker

== Charts ==
Chart (1997)	Peak position
Canada (Nielsen SoundScan)	14
Canada Top Singles (RPM)	67
US Billboard Hot 100	90
US Mainstream Rock (Billboard)	6

== Certifications ==
Certifications for "King Nothing"
Region	Certification	Certified units/sales
United States (RIAA)	Gold	500,000^{‡}
^{‡} Sales+streaming figures based on certification alone.
