= Bleeding Me =

1997 promotional single by Metallica

Promotional single by Metallica

from the album Load
- Released: March 11, 1997
- Recorded: May 1, 1995 – February 1, 1996
- Studio: The Plant, Sausalito, California
- Genre: Hard rock
- Length: 8:18
- Label: Elektra
- Composers: James Hetfield; Lars Ulrich; Kirk Hammett
- Lyricist: James Hetfield
- Producers: Bob Rock; James Hetfield; Lars Ulrich

Metallica singles chronology
| "King Nothing" (1997) | "Bleeding Me" (1997) | "The Memory Remains" (1997) |

"Bleeding Me" is a song by American heavy metal band Metallica from their 1996 album, Load. Although never commercially released as a single, a promotional CD was sent out to radio stations in 1997, and the song would eventually reach #6 on the US Mainstream Rock chart.

== Lyrics ==
Like many songs on Load, "Bleeding Me" features some of the most personal lyrics James Hetfield has ever written about. In a 2001 interview with Playboy, he explained the meaning of the song:

"Around the time of Load, I felt I wanted to stop drinking. "Maybe I'm missing out on something. Everyone else seems so happy all the time. I want to get happy." I'd plan my life around a hangover: "The Misfits are playing in town Friday night, so Saturday is hangover day." I lost a lot of days in my life. Going to therapy for a year, I learned a lot about myself. There's a lot of things that scar you when you're growing up, you don't know why. The song 'Bleeding Me' is about that: I was trying to bleed out all bad, get the evil out. While I was going through therapy, I discovered some ugly stuff in there. A dark spot."

== Personnel ==
Credits are adapted from the album's liner notes.

Metallica

- James Hetfield – guitars, vocals
- Kirk Hammett – guitars
- Jason Newsted – bass
- Lars Ulrich – drums

Additional musician

- Jim McGillveray – percussion

== Track listing ==
1. "Bleeding Me" (Radio Edit) – 5:57
2. "Bleeding Me" – 8:18

== Weekly charts ==
| Chart (1997) | Peak position |
|---|---|
| US Mainstream Rock (Billboard) | 6 |
| US Active Rock (Billboard) | 2 |
| US Heritage Rock (Billboard) | 15 |
