= Hero of the Day =

1996 single by Metallica

Single by Metallica

from the album Load
- B-side: "Kill/Ride Medley"
- Released: September 9, 1996
- Recorded: December 13, 1995
- Studio: The Plant (Sausalito, California)
- Genre: Alternative rock
- Length: 4:21
- Label: Elektra; Vertigo
- Composers: James Hetfield; Lars Ulrich; Kirk Hammett
- Lyricist: James Hetfield
- Producers: Bob Rock; James Hetfield; Lars Ulrich

Metallica singles chronology
"Until It Sleeps" (1996)	"Hero of the Day" (1996)	"Mama Said" (1996)

Music video
- "Hero of the Day" on YouTube

"Hero of the Day" is a song by American heavy metal band Metallica from their sixth studio album, Load (1996). The song was recorded on December 13, 1995, at Plant Studios in Sausalito, California. "Hero of the Day" was Metallica's second single from the album, released in September 1996 by Elektra and Vertigo Records. The song became their second consecutive number-one hit on the US Billboard Mainstream Rock Tracks chart and reached number two in Australia, number three in Finland, and number eight in Norway. On the US Billboard Hot 100 and Cash Box Top 100 charts, it peaked at numbers 60 and 84. The song is one of the few Metallica songs written primarily in a major key. A promotional video for the track was also filmed, directed by Anton Corbijn.

The "Hero of the Day" single is notable for including four Motörhead cover songs, recorded live direct to two-track at The Plant Studios during a rehearsal for Lemmy's 50th Birthday Party at Los Angeles' Whisky a Go Go nightclub. These B-sides were later released on the second CD of the Garage Inc. compilation in 1998.

== History ==
According to an article in the rock music magazine Kerrang, around the time of Load's release, the demo for the song was entitled "Mouldy" due to the main riff reminding James Hetfield and Lars Ulrich of a typical Bob Mould sound. The demo was recorded on December 10, 1994, one of the earliest demo recordings for the Load sessions (the first demo to be recorded was for "Wasting My Hate" on November 28, 1994).

== Critical reception ==
Discussing the style of the song, Loudwire opined "Hero of the Day" to be a "mellifluous saunter into soft rock territory". Terry Bezer of Louder Sound called the song "epic".

== Music video ==
The music video for "Here of the Day" was directed by Dutch director Anton Corbijn and filmed in August 1996 in Los Angeles and premiered on August 21, 1996.

The clip features a drug-addled man watching a television, with every channel featuring Metallica in some way. A Western movie titled Load is featured, starring Jason Newsted and James Hetfield, followed by a boxing match with Hetfield as coach, and Newsted and Kirk Hammett as the fighters. After a drink called "Load" is advertised by Ulrich and Hetfield in matching suits, a game show called "Hero of the Day" (which is a parody of Jeopardy!) is seen being played of which Newsted is the host, and Hetfield, Hammett, and Lars Ulrich appearing as the contestants. Then, it cuts to the news with the anchorman played by Hammett and featuring a clip of Hetfield singing the lyrics to the song. A girl calls at the man's house and they later try having sex, but the young man is unaroused, and leans back in his bed, visibly disappointed. The girl later leaves. At the end, the youth passes out, and dreams of tiny robot creatures, rendered in stop motion, emerging from his ear. He awakes from the dream and vomits into his toilet.

== Track listings ==
US CD and cassette single
No.	Title	Length
1.	"Hero of the Day"	4:22
2.	"Kill/Ride Medley" (live at Castle Donington, England, August 26, 1995)	10:17

UK CD1
No.	Title	Length
1.	"Hero of the Day"	4:22
2.	"Overkill"	4:07
3.	"Damage Case"	3:53
4.	"Hero of the Day" (Outta B-Sides Mix)	6:34

UK CD2
No.	Title	Length
1.	"Hero of the Day"	4:22
2.	"Stone Dead Forever"	5:06
3.	"Too Late Too Late"	3:18
4.	"Mouldy" (aka "Hero of the Day"—early demo version)	5:22

UK limited-edition maxi-CD single (MotörheadACHE)
No.	Title	Length
1.	"Hero of the Day"	4:22
2.	"Overkill"	4:07
3.	"Damage Case"	3:53
4.	"Stone Dead Forever"	5:06
5.	"Too Late Too Late"	3:18

Japanese EP
No.	Title	Length
1.	"Hero of the Day"	4:24
2.	"Mouldy" (aka "Hero of the Day"—early demo version)	5:24
3.	"Hero of the Day" (Outta B Side Mix)	6:35
4.	"Stone Dead Forever"	4:50
5.	"Damage Case"	3:38
6.	"Too Late Too Late"	3:13

== Personnel ==
According to Benoît Clerc, except where noted.

Metallica

- James Hetfield – vocals, electric guitar, acoustic guitar
- Kirk Hammett – electric guitar, guitar synthesizer
- Jason Newsted – bass
- Lars Ulrich – drums

Additional musician

- Jim McGillveray – tambourine

== Charts ==
=== Weekly charts ===
Weekly chart performance for "Hero of the Day"
Chart (1996)	Peak position
Australia (ARIA)	2
Austria (Ö3 Austria Top 40)	29
Belgium (Ultratop 50 Flanders)	30
Canada (Nielsen SoundScan)	7
Denmark (IFPI)	7
Europe (Eurochart Hot 100)	20
Finland (Suomen virallinen lista)	3
Germany (GfK)	39
Hungary (Mahasz)	9
Iceland (Íslenski Listinn Topp 40)	18
Ireland (IRMA)	16
Netherlands (Dutch Top 40)	19
Netherlands (Single Top 100)	25
New Zealand (Recorded Music NZ)	21
Norway (VG-lista)	8
Scottish Singles Sales (Official Charts)	16
Sweden (Sverigetopplistan)	10
UK Singles (Official Charts)	17
UK Rock & Metal (Official Charts)	1
US Billboard Hot 100	60
US Mainstream Rock Airplay (Billboard)	1
US Cash Box Top 100	84

=== Year-end charts ===
1996 year-end chart performance for "Hero of the Day"
Chart (1996)	Position
Australia (ARIA)	52
Sweden (Topplistan)	88
US Mainstream Rock Tracks (Billboard)	36

2002 year-end chart performance for "Hero of the Day"
Chart (2002)	Position
Canada (Nielsen SoundScan)	189

== Certifications ==
Certifications for "Hero of the Day"
Region	Certification	Certified units/sales
Australia (ARIA)	Platinum	70,000^{‡}
New Zealand (RMNZ)	Gold	15,000^{‡}
United States (RIAA)	Gold	500,000^{‡}
^{‡} Sales+streaming figures based on certification alone.
