= Load (album) =

Studio album by Metallica
- Released: June 4, 1996
- Recorded: May 1995 – April 1996
- Studios: The Plant (Sausalito, California); Right Track (New York City)
- Genres: Hard rock; heavy metal
- Length: 78:59
- Labels: Elektra; Vertigo
- Producers: Bob Rock; James Hetfield; Lars Ulrich

Metallica chronology
Live Shit: Binge & Purge (1993)	Load (1996)	Reload (1997)

Singles from Load
- 1. "Until It Sleeps" Released: May 20, 1996; 2. "Hero of the Day" Released: September 9, 1996; 3. "Mama Said" Released: November 25, 1996; 4. "King Nothing" Released: January 7, 1997

Load is the sixth studio album by American heavy metal band Metallica, released on June 4, 1996, through Elektra Records in the United States and Vertigo Records internationally. It was recorded between May 1995 and April 1996 primarily in Sausalito, California, with additional sessions in New York City. Bob Rock returned as producer, having previously produced their fifth studio album, Metallica, in 1991. Compared to previous albums, the recording sessions were more relaxed and productive, resulting in almost 30 songs being recorded. While a double album was considered, the band decided to split the material into two albums; half appeared on Load, and the other half was released as Reload the following year.

For Load, Metallica strayed away from their thrash metal roots in favor of a hard rock sound. The band members became influenced by non-metal artists during the writing process, resulting in an array of musical styles such as Southern rock, blues rock, country rock, alternative rock, and grunge. The band also changed up their playing styles, with lead guitarist Kirk Hammett playing rhythm guitar parts for the first time. Compared to previous albums, the lyrics on Load are more personal and reflective, resulting from lead singer James Hetfield's internal struggles and personal life. The cover artwork is an abstract painting by artist Andres Serrano, created by mixing blood and semen.

Metallica adopted a new image during the period, which included short hair, leather jackets, and make-up. The new look and change in sound were criticized by many fans before Load's release. Nevertheless, Load was a commercial success, topping the charts in over 15 countries and spending four consecutive weeks at number one on the US Billboard 200 chart. The album was certified 5× Platinum by the Recording Industry Association of America (RIAA) in 2003. Four singles were released: "Until It Sleeps", "Hero of the Day", "Mama Said", and "King Nothing"; the first became Metallica's first and only US Top 10 hit. The band supported the album on the Poor Touring Me tour (1996–1997).

Load received mixed reviews from music critics. While some critics praised the band's performances and welcomed the new sound, others felt that the album's direction was uninspired and lacked innovation. Retrospective reviewers generally describe Load as overlong and believe it and Reload could have been condensed into a single album. A super deluxe reissue was released in June 2025.

== Background ==
Metallica released their fifth studio album, Metallica, in August 1991. A major commercial success, it debuted at number one in the United States and the United Kingdom, among others, eventually becoming one of the best-selling albums of all time with estimated sales of 30 million copies worldwide. With the album, Metallica became one of the biggest rock bands in the world. From 1991 to 1993, the band toured to promote Metallica, performing 266 concerts across three concert tours. Another tour followed in mid-1994 to promote the live album Live Shit: Binge & Purge (1993).

Throughout early 1994, the band members spent time away from each other: lead vocalist and rhythm guitarist James Hetfield devoted time to hunting; lead guitarist Kirk Hammett studied film, jazz, and Asian arts at San Francisco State University; bassist Jason Newsted created his own recording studio, The Chophouse; and drummer Lars Ulrich took the band's label, Elektra Records, to court in hopes of breaking their contract following a disagreement with the label's new management. The two parties eventually reached an agreement, with Metallica staying with Elektra under a new contract.

== Recording ==
Beginning in May 1994, Hetfield and Ulrich worked as a duo in the latter's basement recording studio, The Dungeon, observing the band members' demos recorded on the road over the past two years. Full-band rehearsals began in October and finished in January 1995. At this point, the band members' influences ranged outside of heavy metal: Hetfield immersed himself in songwriters such as Leonard Cohen, Tom Waits, and Nick Cave, and American folk and country music; Hammett grew interested in David Bowie's works with Robert Fripp and Adrian Belew, and the blues music of Muddy Waters, Buddy Guy, and Howlin' Wolf; Newsted grew fond of Red Hot Chili Peppers and Faith No More, particularly the bass playing of the former's Flea; and Ulrich was enjoying Britpop groups such as Oasis. The wide range of influences proved productive for the band. By the time the proper recording sessions began, they had almost 30 completed songs. These included "Streamline" ("Wasting My Hate"), "Load" ("King Nothing"), "Devil Dance" ("Devil's Dance"), "Fixer" ("Fixxxer"), and "Mouldy" ("Hero of the Day").

First we chose riffs that were great, and Lars and I would go jam on them. Then, instead of trying to force one riff with another riff, it was like, 'Let's jam on it,' and we'd see what came out of that. ... It was more of a feel thing when we were writing this stuff. So the songs kinda started writing themselves, in a way, which was a little more fun than just trying to stick a bunch of riffs together.

— James Hetfield on Load's songwriting process, 1996

The recording sessions for the new album began on May 1, 1995, at The Plant Studios in Sausalito, California. The sessions reunited Metallica with producer Bob Rock and engineer Randy Staub from Metallica. Despite having clashed during the production of Metallica, the band and Rock had settled their differences in the following years while on tour and decided to work together again. Hetfield explained that Rock "tends to help us dig deeper. We tell him what we're after and he tries to help us achieve that". He credited Rock with helping him deliver stronger vocal performances. The recording atmosphere was productive, and the band's songwriting process became looser and more relaxed compared to previous albums. Hetfield attributed this to the band members taking a break from each other, allowing each member to mature and return with more respect for one another. Newsted agreed: "The studio thing has definitely gotten more comfortable. ... I think since everybody has their own life [that is] really strong in its own way with their own set of friends, I think we're really comfortable when we do get together and things like this."

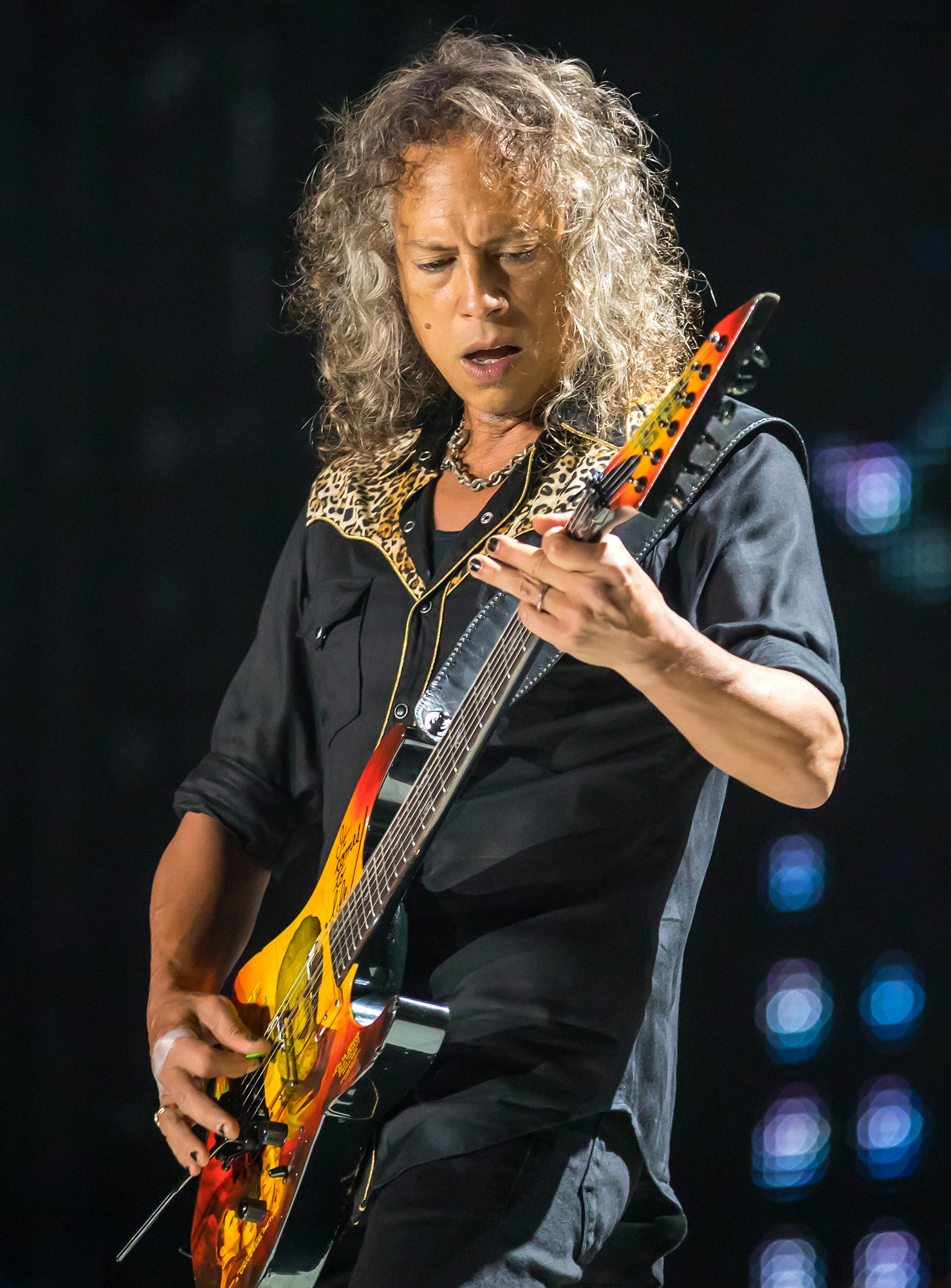
Guitarist Kirk Hammett (pictured in 2017) played rhythm guitar parts for the first time on a Metallica album.

Encouraged by Ulrich, Hammett played rhythm guitar for the first time on a Metallica album, having previously only played lead parts while Hetfield played all rhythm parts. Hammett said this was done to achieve "a looser sound". He ultimately became more influential in the songwriting process, sharing co-writing credits with Hetfield and Ulrich on seven of the final album's fourteen tracks. Newsted, on the other hand, felt isolated as his song ideas were dismissed by the other band members, particularly Hetfield. He also believed that the band's fanbase was not "ready to hear [them] sounding like more typical hard rock and roll music". Newsted felt trapped within Metallica and began working on side projects such as IR8. An IR8 demo tape ended up being played on a San Francisco radio station, which angered Hetfield and Ulrich. Newsted nevertheless did not want bad blood between them, acknowledging Metallica as Hetfield and Ulrich's band and a carefree attitude towards songwriting credits, because "I still put my signature on it". At Rock's insistence, Newsted changed his bass playing to his own style rather than doubling the guitar parts; he had begun to perform this way on Metallica but fully embraced it for Load.

Metallica worked for most of the next year, with a break for the summer festival season. A short tour commenced in August, during which the band debuted two new songs, "2 X 4" and "Devil's Dance". In November, Hetfield learned of his father's cancer diagnosis and briefly departed for Wyoming to be with him, using the time away to write lyrics. The following month, Metallica made an appearance at the Whisky a Go Go nightclub, honoring the 50th birthday of Motörhead's singer Lemmy, performing several Motörhead covers. In January 1996, with so many new songs recorded, the band decided to scrap the idea of a double album and release the material as two separate albums. This was decided for multiple reasons. Firstly, the band would have had to back out of the 1996 Lollapalooza festival to complete production of the double album. Secondly, a double album only counts as one album on your contract, according to Ulrich, so "this way it counts as two [and] we get the pot of gold at the end even quicker!" Lastly, the workload tired the members out. Hetfield said at the time: "As time went on we realized that we couldn't tackle all of it at once; we were like nine months into the recording and weren't even done with half of the songs. It was too hard to focus." So, half the songs would be released first as Load and the other half as Reload the following year.

Concerned about the long recording process, Elektra Records set May 1, 1996, as the mastering date for the upcoming album. From March to April 1996, the band was in New York City recording overdubs and commencing mixing at Right Track Studios, with further mixing being done at nearby Quad Recording Studios. The band invited local journalists to these sessions to hear previews of the new album. Hetfield's father died in late February 1996, after which Hetfield returned to New York to finish recording. In an interview with Rolling Stone, he stated that he "went back to when [former Metallica bassist] Cliff [Burton] died" and "got some of the feelings out through the music".

Load is Metallica's longest studio album at 78 minutes and 59 seconds in length, the maximum duration a single CD could be. The long length was marketed by Elektra through advertisements on MTV and stickers affixed to initial pressings of the album itself. "The Outlaw Torn" had to be shortened by one minute to fit on the album; the full version of the track was released on the Reload single "The Memory Remains" as "The Outlaw Torn (Unencumbered by Manufacturing Restrictions Version)", with a running time of 10:48.

== Composition ==
=== Music ===
This album and what we're doing with it – that, to me, is what Metallica are all about: exploring different things. The minute you stop exploring, then just sit down and fucking die.

— Lars Ulrich on Load's exploratory nature, 1996

Load represented a stylistic departure for Metallica away from their thrash metal roots in favor of a hard rock sound. While the band had already taken a step away from thrash metal on Metallica, they went further on Load, resulting in a "cleaner" sound. At the time of the album's release, thrash metal had been on a decline amidst the rising grunge and alternative rock movements. The authors Joel McIver and Paul Stenning argue that with Load and its follow-up Reload, Metallica recognized and adapted to a changing music scene, compared to other metal bands such as Slayer, who stuck to their formula.

Primarily a hard rock and heavy metal album, Load features a variety of musical influences from genres such as Southern rock, blues rock, country rock, alternative rock, and grunge. Numerous critics have compared the music to 1970s-era hard rock bands like Lynyrd Skynyrd, Led Zeppelin, AC/DC, Aerosmith, and ZZ Top. Metallica had listed several artists and bands they were inspired by while writing Load and Reload that took them away from their thrash roots, including Alice in Chains, Soundgarden, Primus, Pantera, Ted Nugent, Oasis, and Alanis Morissette, among others; the songs "Mama Said" and "Wasting My Hate" were inspired by Hetfield's friendship with Waylon Jennings. Hetfield described Load as "the U2 version of Metallica".

Load was Metallica's first album on which all tracks were down-tuned to E♭ tuning. Hammett said it was his attempt to play like Jimi Hendrix, Stevie Ray Vaughan, and Thin Lizzy. Hetfield liked the change, believing the semitone drop in pitch gave his voice a "break". According to McIver, allowing Hammett to play rhythm guitar led to a looser, less "metal" and more "rock" sound, a result of Hetfield's growing maturity and the band's "desire to move forward". The band members also utilized more experimentation in their playing styles. Jon Pareles describes Ulrich's drumming as "land[ing] with brutal certainty a nanosecond behind the beat, letting the guitars and bass claw each power chord unencumbered". Hammett used slide guitar on "Ain't My Bitch" and various amplifiers to create different textures and soundscapes on "Hero of the Day"; Hetfield used a talk box to perform the guitar solo on "The House Jack Built", (Note: This was the first and only time a talk box was used on a Metallica album.) and a pedal steel guitar on "Mama Said"; and Newsted played a fretless bass on "Until It Sleeps" and used different amplifier effects to achieve his bass sound on "Thorn Within". Hammett described his guitar solo on "Bleeding Me" as a summation of all his influences, "with a good dose of my own style".

=== Lyrics ===
"Mama Said"
"Mama Said" is a country rock and Southern rock ballad, with lyrics about the death of Hetfield's mother.

Compared to previous albums, which touched on themes of confronting a frightening outside world, the lyrics on Load are more personal and reflective, influenced by topics such as neurosis ("Thorn Within", "Poor Twisted Me") and psychotherapy ("Until It Sleeps"). Hetfield maintained that he wanted the lyrics to be vague to allow for listener interpretation. Nevertheless, the lyrics are amongst the band's most personal yet, with the author Mick Wall stating that they offer insight into Hetfield's psyche; several songs are addressed to himself. "Bleeding Me" was an "intensely personal" song about some of Hetfield's biggest internal struggles. He explained that "I was going through therapy at the time and I was so unwilling... it was like the therapist had put leeches on me just to get it all out. There was a lot of secret pain, so that song came from me experiencing therapy for the first time." "Mama Said" and "Until It Sleeps" are about the death and relationship, respectively, of Hetfield's mother, while "Hero of the Day" offers "estranged youth" and "mother-and-child" themes. Death and pain are also the main subjects of "The Outlaw Torn". Religion also impacted some of the lyrics, such as on "Thorn Within". "Ronnie" concerns a shooting that occurred in Washington state in 1995. The author Benoît Clerc believes it may have been inspired by the story of Ronnie Long, an African-American man imprisoned in 1976 for a crime he did not commit, who was eventually released in 2020.

== Artwork and packaging ==
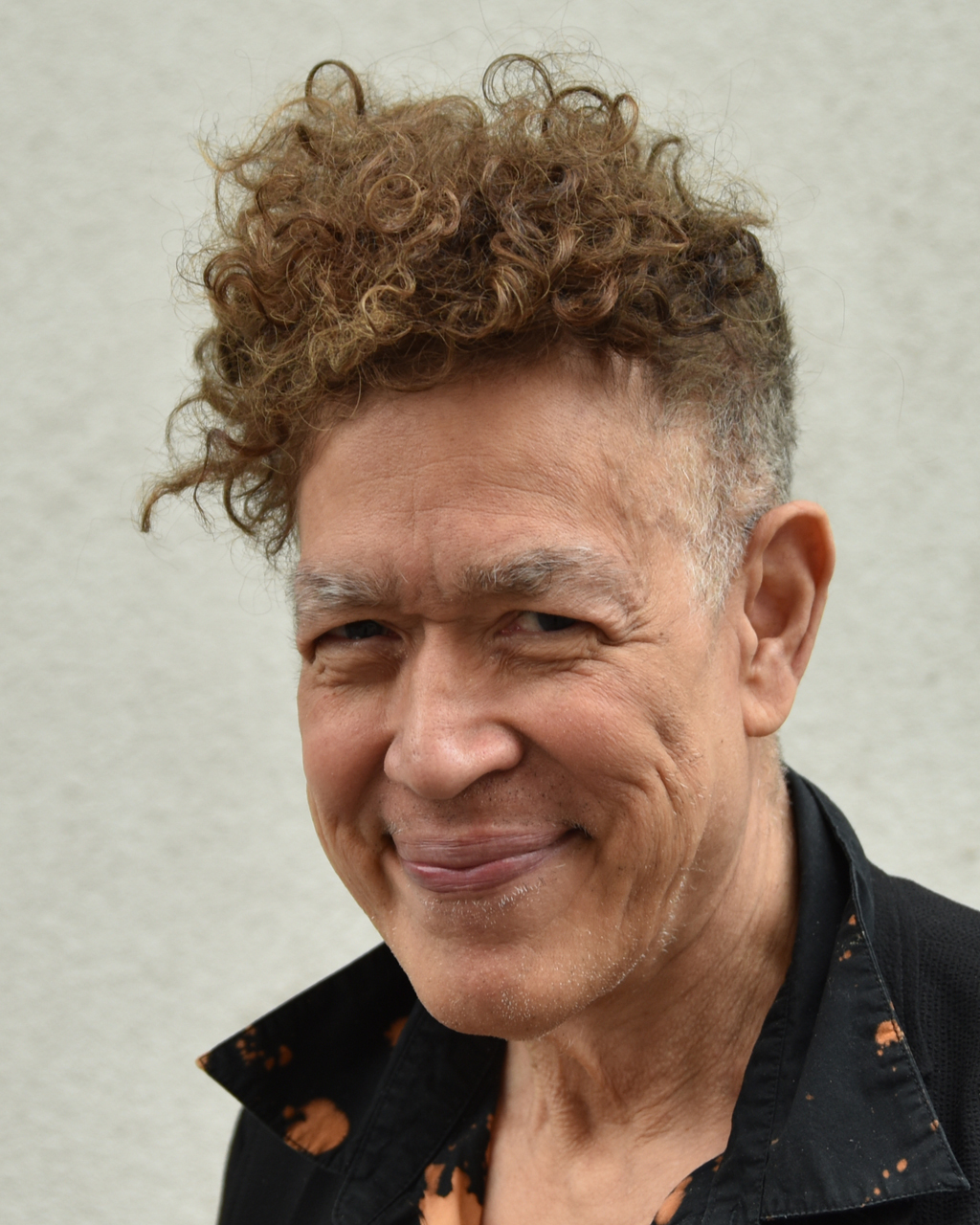
The cover art for Load was created by New York artist Andres Serrano (pictured in 2023).

The cover of Load is an original artwork titled Semen and Blood III. It is one of three photographic studies created by New York artist Andres Serrano in 1990 by mingling bovine blood and his own semen between two sheets of Plexiglas. Hammett came across the photo in an art book of Serrano's work titled Body and Soul that he purchased from the San Francisco Museum of Modern Art. He said at the time that, at first glance, he thought it resembled hot-rod flames due to a similar tattoo he had. Recalling the abstract art and psychedelia of a 1960s gig poster, the image depicts an amoeba-like blend of strawberry-red and creamy white tones swirling against a mottled black background. Serrano had known of the band but was unaware of their music. He appreciated the collaboration and believed it would help expand his audience. Hammett wanted the picture as Load's cover artwork because he thought it was "beautiful" and "it was the form, not the content, that was great". One of Serrano's artworks was also used for the cover of Reload the following year.

Not all band members liked the photo. While Ulrich loved it, Newsted hated it and refused to discuss it in interviews. Hammett believed Newsted "cared too much about what the fans think", although he did not want fan reactions to "dictate or censor" what he did. Hetfield felt indifferent about the artwork and was more concerned about potential backlash from retailers who would refuse to sell the album over the cover. In 2009, Hetfield expressed his dislike of the artwork, calling it a "piss-take" around art made "for the sake of shocking others". Due to the band's differing views, a compromise was reached wherein the artwork's title would not appear in the album's liner notes, but Serrano remained credited as the cover artist. In a 2018 interview, Ulrich maintained his appreciation for the Load and Reload covers, calling them his favorite Metallica album covers.

Load featured a new Metallica logo that simplified and modernized its appearance, going from "metal" to "alternative". The album booklet featured photographs of the band by Anton Corbijn, a former collaborator of U2 and Depeche Mode. With Load, the band adopted a new image that strayed away from their metal roots. They wore short hair, tailored shirts, leather jackets, and make-up. At certain press events, Hammett and Ulrich kissed each other.

== Release and promotion ==
When Load was unveiled in May 1996, fan reactions were mixed, with many criticizing Metallica's new image and change in sound. Some regarded it as a betrayal of the band's heavy metal roots. Hammett said: "I think we made a really fucking great album, and people aren't going to walk away from our music even if they think we look like 'poofs'. At the end of the day, it all begins and ends with the music. I think we're now much more than a heavy metal band." In a 1999 interview, Ulrich described the heavy-metal audience as "very conservative" and resistant to change, saying, "If at the end of the day someone's opinion of us comes down to whether we're wearing leather jackets, then they shouldn't be buying the records." In 2022, Rock commended the band for not caring what the fans think and doing "what they feel is right for them".

Load was released on June 4, 1996, (Note: Reportedly released a day earlier in the UK on June 3.) through Elektra Records in the United States and Vertigo Records in the United Kingdom and Europe, in CD, cassette, and double LP formats. The album was a commercial success, debuting and spending four consecutive weeks at number one on the US Billboard 200 chart. The album sold 680,000 units in its first week, making it the biggest opening week for Metallica as well as the biggest debut of 1996. In 2003, it was certified 5× platinum by the Recording Industry Association of America (RIAA) for shipping five million copies in the United States. Load also attained number one positions in the UK, Australia, Austria, Belgium Flanders, Czech Republic, Denmark, the Netherlands, Finland, France, Germany, Hungary, New Zealand, Norway, Portugal, Scotland, Sweden, and Switzerland. Load reached number two in Belgium (Wallonia), Ireland, Italy, and Spain, and number eight in Zimbabwe. Nevertheless, according to Wall, overall sales were less than half of Metallica.

=== Singles ===
"Until It Sleeps" was released as the lead single on May 20, 1996. Its avant-garde music video displays the band in their new image and features neo-biblical imagery, including references to the Hieronymus Bosch paintings The Garden of Earthly Delights, The Haywain, and Ecce Homo. It was directed by Samuel Bayer and filmed in May 1996 in Los Angeles, California. The video won the MTV Video Music Award for Best Rock Video in 1996. The single became Metallica's first – and to date only – top ten single on the US Billboard Hot 100, as well as the band's second top five in the UK, with number one positions in Australia, Sweden, and Finland. "Hero of the Day" was released as the second single on September 10. Its music video, directed by Anton Corbijn and filmed in August 1996 in Los Angeles, centers on a "drugged-up kid" staring at a television while Load-themed channels play, all featuring the Metallica members. It stalled on the Billboard Hot 100 at number 60, but was the band's second number-one single on the Mainstream Rock chart after "Until It Sleeps".

"Mama Said" appeared as the third single on November 25. Its music video, also directed by Corbijn, was filmed in November 1996 in London. It features Hetfield playing the song on an acoustic guitar, sitting alone in the back seat of a car. He travels down a metaphorical highway while the other three members peer at him through the windows. At the end, it is revealed that the back seat was a studio prop, after which Hetfield and a white horse walk off-screen. It reached number 19 in the UK. The fourth and final single, "King Nothing", was released in the US and Canada only on January 7, 1997. It was promoted by a music video directed by Matt Mahurin and filmed in December 1996 in Park City, Utah. It reached number 90 on the Billboard Hot 100 and number six on the Mainstream Rock chart.

=== Tour ===
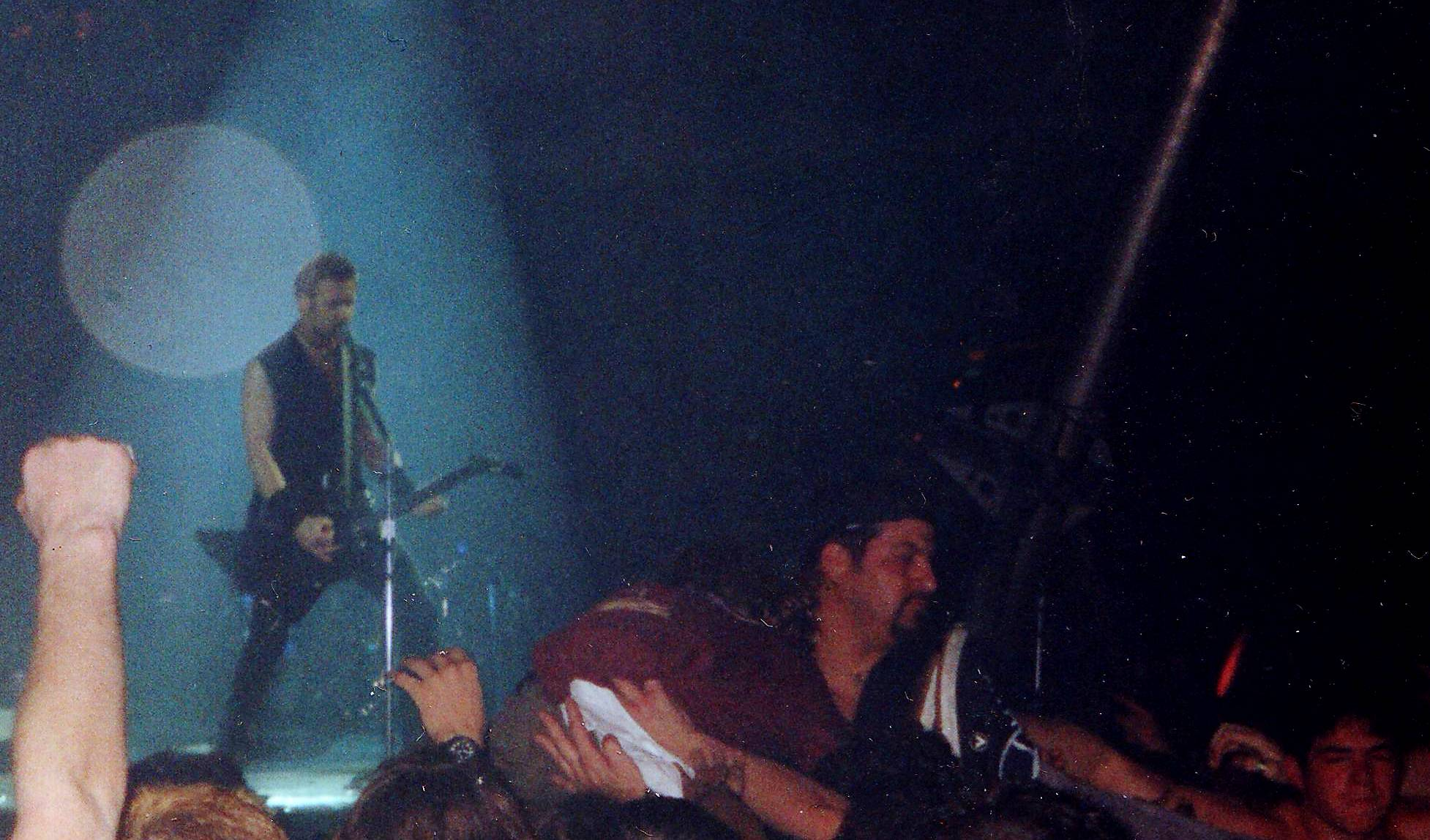
Hetfield performing live with Metallica in Cardiff during the Poor Touring Me tour in 1996

Metallica performed various fanclub-only shows in June, after which they performed at the 1996 Lollapalooza festival. Metallica's appearance at the festival was controversial; longtime fans of the band accused them of selling out, while regular festival attendees believed their appearance was hijacking the music and culture the festival had been originally designed to reject. Metallica performed at the festival as a headliner, sharing the bill with Soundgarden, the Ramones, Rancid, and Screaming Trees.

After the Lollapalooza shows, Metallica embarked on the Poor Touring Me tour, which spanned 19 countries and ran 125 concerts from September 6, 1996, to May 28, 1997. Newsted said, "We wanted to take the music to a new generation of Metallica fans." The tour began in Europe, where the band made appearances on the British television show Later... with Jools Holland and at the European MTV Awards in November. The American leg began in late December and spanned the entire United States and Canada. The band enjoyed their time on the road, with Ulrich stating the band members were in the best physical and mental shapes of their career. Ulrich and Hetfield married their respective girlfriends in January and August 1997, respectively.

At the end of the tour, Metallica announced Load's follow-up album, Reload, to be released in November. Reload was composed of outtakes from the Load sessions, with additional recording sessions taking place from July to October 1997. Upon its release, like Load, Reload was a commercial success, debuting at number one on the US Billboard 200, although overall sales were less than Load.

== Critical reception ==
Professional ratings
Review scores
Source	Rating
AllMusic	2.5/5 stars
Drowned in Sound	9/10
The Encyclopedia of Popular Music	4/5 stars
Entertainment Weekly	B
Los Angeles Times	3.5/4 stars
NME	7/10
Q	4/5 stars
Rolling Stone	4/5 stars
The Rolling Stone Album Guide	4/5 stars
The Village Voice	C+

Load received mixed to positive reviews from critics. Positive reviews praised the band's performances and welcomed the change in sound. Musician magazine's Mac Randall said that "The boys are more into cohesion now, more interested in the slow increase of momentum." Rolling Stone's David Fricke believed that longtime fans should get over the change in image and appreciate the band's growth with "easily the heaviest record of the year". Q enthused, "These boys set up their tents in the darkest place of all, in the naked horror of their own heads... Metallica are still awesome... What is new is streamlined attack, the focus and, yes, the tunes." Entertainment Weekly's David Browne wrote that the band "approach each song on Load with grim, teeth-gritting determination" and exhibit "subtle" signs of emotional growth. Kerrang! editor Phil Alexander wrote that Metallica has "let their individual talents breathe" and with Load, the band "still tower over the competition with audacity and power".

Others were more mixed on Load. Some critics felt that the change in style resulted in an album that was less forward-thinking and more conventional, failing to push the band forward creatively compared to past releases. Jon Pareles of The New York Times remarked that "for the first time, Metallica sounds as if it's looking over its shoulder, wondering where it fits in the era of grunge". Howard Cohen of the Miami Herald felt that Load sounded "tame" compared to Metallica's previous records, which Browne attributed to the "clean but parched production". Melody Maker expressed reservations about Load's heaviness compared to its predecessors: "A Metallica album is traditionally an exhausting event. It should rock you to exhaustion, leave you brutalised and drained. This one is no exception. It is, however, the first Metallica album to make me wonder at any point, 'What the fuck was that?' It's as if the jackboot grinding the human face were to take occasional breaks for a pedicure." In The Village Voice, Robert Christgau said "this is just a metal record with less solo room, which is good because it concentrates their chops, and more singing, which isn't because they can't." AllMusic's Stephen Thomas Erlewine considered Load repetitive, uninteresting, and poorly executed. One of Metallica's contemporaries, Slayer's Kerry King, expressed his dislike for Load in a 1996 interview with Kerrang! magazine, saying that the music lacks "attitude" and "fire".

== Legacy ==
Opinions on Load and Reload have been mixed in the years and decades following its release. Both albums have typically placed low in lists ranking Metallica's studio albums. Many commentators agree that Load is bloated and overlong. The author Paul Stenning wrote that several songs sound like extended jams rather than having coherent structures. Metal Hammer's Paul Brannigan said that Load's main fault was "quality control", containing tracks that can be considered "throwaway" and "mediocre". Some have argued that Load and Reload could have been one "pretty good" album, but the band was "too loose" regarding editing. In his 2004 biography of the band, Joel McIver argues that with the experimentation, Metallica lost sight of themselves and what they succeeded at best: "heavy metal with power, aggression, and kill". Others have shown appreciation for Load. In 2022, Louder's Terry Bezer called the album underrated and Metallica's "last great album". The following year, Loudwire's Jon Wiederhorn argued that the songs on Load are "solid and well-composed" and the album rewards repeated listens. In 2022, Metal Hammer ranked it among the ten best albums of 1996.

[We were] trying to be something we weren't and that confused us even further musically. There's quite a few great songs on there that could have been greater if the cover and the pictures were different I think. A lot of the fans got turned off quite a bit from the music but mostly, I think, from the image. It just doesn't work. You absolutely have to evolve, but let's have it evolve naturally. It didn't seem natural to me.

— James Hetfield, 2003

The band has held mixed opinions on the Load and Reload period in subsequent decades. Hetfield felt he was following Hammett and Ulrich's vision and did not believe in the idea of revamping their image. He felt that the large number of songs "diluted the potency of the poison of Metallica". Hetfield also believed that former bassist Cliff Burton, if still alive, would likely have disapproved of the direction the band took for the two albums. Nevertheless, Hetfield did not regret the period because it "felt like the right thing to do" at the time. When interviewed in 2002, Ulrich said he liked some of the material from Load and Reload and was more disappointed that fans reacted poorly to the music based on the band members' new image rather than the music itself. By 2003, Ulrich agreed that the two albums could have been condensed into one, but felt that at the time, he and Hetfield wanted to release all the newly-written songs and lacked "an edit button on our instrument panel". Reflecting on Load, Hammett said that pushing boundaries and surprising fans is part of Metallica's creative identity. He acknowledged that taking risks can either be rewarding or damaging, but ultimately, the band stayed true to themselves by experimenting and letting the music guide them. Bob Rock also remained proud of Load and Reload, believing it would have been wrong to copy Metallica. Speaking in 2025, Rock said: "Those records are on par with everything else that we've done creatively... I'm very proud of those records."

== 2025 box set ==
Professional ratings
Deluxe Box Set
Review scores
Source	Rating
Pitchfork	6.6/10
Rolling Stone	3.5/5 stars

Load was reissued as a super deluxe box set on June 13, 2025. Described in a press release as "an ambitious and comprehensive time capsule of 1995–1997 era Metallica", the super deluxe set includes previously unreleased demos, rough mixes, videos, live recordings, and more. The physical release is spread across 15 CDs, six vinyl records, four DVDs, a 128-page hardcover book, and additional materials. The reissue also includes a new remaster of the original album by Reuben Cohen and the original extended version of "The Outlaw Torn", which was edited down due to manufacturing limits.

Reviewing the deluxe box set for Pitchfork, Drew Millard enjoyed the live material, believing the Load tracks blended seamlessly with Metallica's older material. He also praised the addition of the band's 1995 live Motörhead covers performed at the Whisky a Go Go for Lemmy's 50th birthday. Discussing Load itself, Millard called it the band's first misstep in their career, but one that was respectable in retrospect, writing: "There is dignity in flagrant, unnecessary failure." Rolling Stone's Joe Gross also praised the live material in the box set, including the band's 1996 Lollapalooza gig. He summarized that Load "remains a reminder of a very specific musical moment, when the various competing versions of rock remained a subject of vigorous debate: Metallica threw on some makeup and stoked the flames."

== Track listing ==
All lyrics are written by James Hetfield.

Load track listing
No.	Title	Music	Length
1.	"Ain't My Bitch"	Hetfield; Lars Ulrich	5:04
2.	"2 X 4"	Hetfield; Ulrich; Kirk Hammett	5:28
3.	"The House Jack Built"	Hetfield; Ulrich; Hammett	6:39
4.	"Until It Sleeps"	Hetfield; Ulrich	4:28
5.	"King Nothing"	Hetfield; Ulrich; Hammett	5:30
6.	"Hero of the Day"	Hetfield; Ulrich; Hammett	4:22
7.	"Bleeding Me"	Hetfield; Ulrich; Hammett	8:18
8.	"Cure"	Hetfield; Ulrich	4:54
9.	"Poor Twisted Me"	Hetfield; Ulrich	4:00
10.	"Wasting My Hate"	Hetfield; Ulrich; Hammett	3:57
11.	"Mama Said"	Hetfield; Ulrich	5:20
12.	"Thorn Within"	Hetfield; Ulrich; Hammett	5:52
13.	"Ronnie"	Hetfield; Ulrich	5:17
14.	"The Outlaw Torn"	Hetfield; Ulrich	9:49
Total length:			78:59

Note

- "2 X 4" is pronounced "2 by 4"

== Personnel ==
Credits are adapted from the album's liner notes, except where noted.

Metallica

- James Hetfield – guitars, vocals
- Lars Ulrich – drums
- Kirk Hammett – guitars
- Jason Newsted – bass

Additional musician

- Jim McGillveray – percussion (all tracks except "Until It Sleeps", "Poor Twisted Me", "Wasting My Hate", and "The Outlaw Torn")

Production

- Bob Rock – production
- James Hetfield – assistant production
- Lars Ulrich – assistant production
- Randy Staub – recording (The Plant), mixing
- Brian Dobbs – recording assistant (The Plant), additional recording engineer (Right Track)
- Kent Matcke – recording assistant (The Plant)
- Jason Goldstein – assistant engineer (Right Track)
- Mike Fraser – additional mixing
- Matt Curry – mixing assistant
- Mike Rew – mixing assistant
- George Marino – mastering
- Reuben Cohen – 2025 remastering
- Paul DeCarli – digital editing
- Mike Gillies – digital editing assistant
- Chris Vrenna – digital editing assistant
- Andie Airfix – design
- Anton Corbijn – photography
- Andres Serrano – cover art

== Charts ==
=== Weekly charts ===
Weekly chart performance for Load
Chart (1996)	Peak position
Australian Albums (ARIA)	1
Austrian Albums (Ö3 Austria)	1
Belgian Albums (Ultratop Flanders)	1
Belgian Albums (Ultratop Wallonia)	2
Canada Top Albums/CDs (RPM)	1
Czech Albums (IFPI)	1
Danish Albums (Hitlisten)	1
Dutch Albums (Album Top 100)	1
Estonian Albums (Eesti Top 10)	1
Europe (European Top 100 Albums)	1
Finnish Albums (Suomen virallinen lista)	1
French Albums (SNEP)	1
German Albums (Offizielle Top 100)	1
Hungarian Albums (MAHASZ)	1
Icelandic Albums (Tónlist)	1
Irish Albums (IRMA)	2
Italian Albums (FIMI)	2
Japanese Albums (Oricon)	3
New Zealand Albums (RMNZ)	1
Norwegian Albums (VG-lista)	1
Portuguese Albums (AFP)	1
Scottish Albums (Official Charts)	1
Singapore Albums (SPVA)	3
Spanish Albums (AFYVE)	2
Swedish Albums (Sverigetopplistan)	1
Swiss Albums (Schweizer Hitparade)	1
UK Albums (Official Charts)	1
UK Rock & Metal Albums (Official Charts)	1
US Billboard 200	1
Zimbabwean Albums	8

2025 weekly chart performance for Load
Chart (2025)	Peak position
Austrian Albums (Ö3 Austria)	6
Belgian Albums (Ultratop Flanders)	29
Belgian Albums (Ultratop Wallonia)	5
Croatian International Albums (HDU)	7
Danish Vinyl Albums (Hitlisten)	5
Dutch Albums (Album Top 100)	15
Finnish Albums (Suomen virallinen lista)	32
German Albums (Offizielle Top 100)	2
German Rock & Metal Albums (Offizielle Top 100)	1
Greek Albums (IFPI)	3
Hungarian Albums (MAHASZ)	35
Japanese Albums (Oricon)	34
New Zealand Albums (RMNZ)	32
Norwegian Albums (VG-lista)	83
Norwegian Physical Albums (IFPI Topplista)	1
Polish Albums (ZPAV)	6
Scottish Albums (Official Charts)	6
Spanish Albums (Promusicae)	43
Swedish Hard Rock Albums (Sverigetopplistan)	4
Swiss Albums (Schweizer Hitparade)	10
UK Albums (Official Charts)	46
UK Rock & Metal Albums (Official Charts)	1
US Billboard 200	64
US Top Hard Rock Albums (Billboard)	4
US Top Rock & Alternative Albums (Billboard)	14

=== Year-end charts ===
1996 year-end chart performance for Load
Chart (1996)	Position
Australian Albums (ARIA)	21
Austrian Albums (Ö3 Austria)	6
Canadian Albums (RPM)	9
Dutch Albums (Album Top 100)	33
European Top 100 Albums (Music & Media)	10
French Albums (SNEP)	17
German Albums (Offizielle Top 100)	6
New Zealand Albums (RMNZ)	17
Norwegian Albums (VG-lista)	21
Spanish Albums (AFYVE)	29
Swedish Albums (Sverigetopplistan)	8
Swiss Albums (Schweizer Hitparade)	23
UK Albums (OCC)	59
US Billboard 200	14

1997 year-end chart performance for Load
Chart (1997)	Position
Canadian Hard Rock Albums (Nielsen Soundscan)	18

=== Decade-end charts ===
1990s-end chart performance for Load
Chart (1990–1999)	Position
US Billboard 200	81

== Certifications ==
Certifications and sales for Load
Region	Certification	Certified units/sales
Argentina (CAPIF)	Platinum	60,000^{^}
Australia (ARIA)	5× Platinum	350,000^{‡}
Austria (IFPI Austria)	Platinum	50,000^{*}
Belgium (BRMA)	Gold	25,000^{*}
Brazil (Pro-Música Brasil)	Gold	100,000^{*}
Canada (Music Canada)	4× Platinum	400,000^{^}
Denmark (IFPI Danmark)	Platinum	50,000^{^}
Finland (Musiikkituottajat)	Platinum	64,384
France (SNEP)	Gold	100,000^{*}
Germany (BVMI)	5× Gold	1,250,000^{‡}
Greece (IFPI Greece)	Gold	31,000
Hungary (MAHASZ)	Gold	
Iceland	—	3,768
Italy (FIMI)	Gold	50,000^{*}
Japan (RIAJ)	Platinum	200,000^{^}
Netherlands (NVPI)	Gold	50,000^{^}
New Zealand (RMNZ)	Platinum	15,000^{^}
Norway (IFPI Norway)	Platinum	50,000^{*}
Poland (ZPAV)	Platinum	100,000^{*}
Portugal (AFP)	Gold	20,000^{^}
Spain (Promusicae)	Platinum	100,000^{^}
Sweden (GLF)	Platinum	100,000^{^}
Switzerland (IFPI Switzerland)	Gold	25,000^{^}
Turkey (Mü-Yap)	Gold	5,000^{*}
United Kingdom (BPI)	Platinum	300,000^{‡}
United States (RIAA)	5× Platinum	5,400,000
Uruguay (CUD)	Gold	3,000^{^}
Summaries
Europe (IFPI)	2× Platinum	2,000,000^{*}
^{*} Sales figures based on certification alone.^{^} Shipments figures based on certification alone.^{‡} Sales+streaming figures based on certification alone.
