= Live at Grimey's =

Live album by Metallica
- Released: November 26, 2010
- Recorded: June 12, 2008 at Grimey's Record Store, Nashville, Tennessee
- Genres: Thrash metal, heavy metal
- Length: 58:41
- Label: Warner Bros.
- Producer: Metallica

Metallica chronology
Six Feet Down Under Part II (2010)	Live at Grimey's (2010)	Lulu (2011)

Professional ratings
Review scores
Source	Rating
Consequence of Sound	C−

Live at Grimey's is a live album by the American heavy metal band Metallica. The album was recorded live on June 12, 2008, at The Basement, a venue beneath Grimey's New & Preloved Music in Nashville, Tennessee, just before their appearance at the Bonnaroo Music Festival. It was released on November 26, 2010. It was released on both CD and vinyl, and is available at independent record stores, as well as the band's website. Over 3,000 copies of the record were sold in its first week.

As opposed to all of Metallica releases from Death Magnetic onwards, Live at Grimey's is its first release since the band's live album S&M (1999) to use the original Metallica logo rather than the more slanted one used for Death Magnetic.

== Track listing ==
All lyrics are written by James Hetfield.

No.	Title	Length
1.	"No Remorse" (Hetfield, Ulrich)	4:54
2.	"Fuel" (Hetfield, Hammett, Ulrich)	4:28
3.	"Harvester of Sorrow" (Hetfield, Ulrich)	6:18
4.	"Welcome Home (Sanitarium)" (Hetfield, Hammett, Ulrich)	7:29
5.	"For Whom the Bell Tolls" (The Frayed Ends of Sanity Jam - Hetfield, Burton, Ulrich)	9:52
6.	"Master of Puppets" (Hetfield, Burton, Hammett, Ulrich)	8:45
7.	"Sad but True" (Hetfield, Ulrich)	5:51
8.	"Motorbreath" (Hetfield)	3:13
9.	"Seek & Destroy" (Hetfield, Ulrich)	7:51
Total length:		58:41

== Personnel ==
- James Hetfield – lead vocals, rhythm guitar
- Kirk Hammett – lead guitar, backing vocals
- Robert Trujillo – bass, backing vocals
- Lars Ulrich – drums
