= Six Feet Down Under Part II =

EP by Metallica
- Released: November 12, 2010 (Australia and New Zealand only)
- Recorded: September 14, 2010 – October 22, 2010, Australia & New Zealand
- Genre: Thrash metal
- Length: 55:44
- Label: Universal Music

Metallica chronology
The Big Four: Live from Sofia, Bulgaria (2010)	Six Feet Down Under Part II (2010)	Live at Grimey's (2010)

Six Feet Down Under Part II is a limited edition commemorative live EP by the American heavy metal band Metallica. It is the second part of the band's previous live EP, Six Feet Down Under, and was released exclusively in Australia and New Zealand, on November 12, 2010 through Universal Music. Like the predecessor EP, it has been sold by Trans-Tasman record stores, Metallica online store and iTunes only, and contains eight songs from the early part of the tour in Australia and New Zealand in 2010 as voted by members of the Metallica Fan Club living in those areas.

== Track listing ==
No.	Title	Recorded	Length
1.	"Blackened"	October 16, 2010 at the Brisbane Entertainment Center, in Brisbane, Australia	6:27
2.	"Ride the Lightning"	October 14, 2010 at the Vector Arena, in Auckland, New Zealand	7:10
3.	"The Four Horsemen"	September 18, 2010 at the Acer Arena, in Sydney, Australia	5:20
4.	"Welcome Home (Sanitarium)"	September 15, 2010 at the Rod Laver Arena, in Melbourne, Australia	6:23
5.	"Master of Puppets"	October 16, 2010 at the Brisbane Entertainment Center, in Brisbane, Australia	8:24
6.	"...And Justice for All"	October 18, 2010 at the Brisbane Entertainment Center, in Brisbane, Australia	9:08
7.	"Fade to Black"	September 18, 2010 at the Acer Arena, in Sydney, Australia	7:33
8.	"Damage, Inc."	September 22, 2010 at the CBS Canterbury Arena, in Christchurch, New Zealand	5:25
Total length:			55:44

== Personnel ==
- James Hetfield – lead vocals, rhythm guitar
- Kirk Hammett – lead guitar, backing vocals
- Robert Trujillo – bass, backing vocals
- Lars Ulrich – drums
