= Metallica =

American heavy metal band

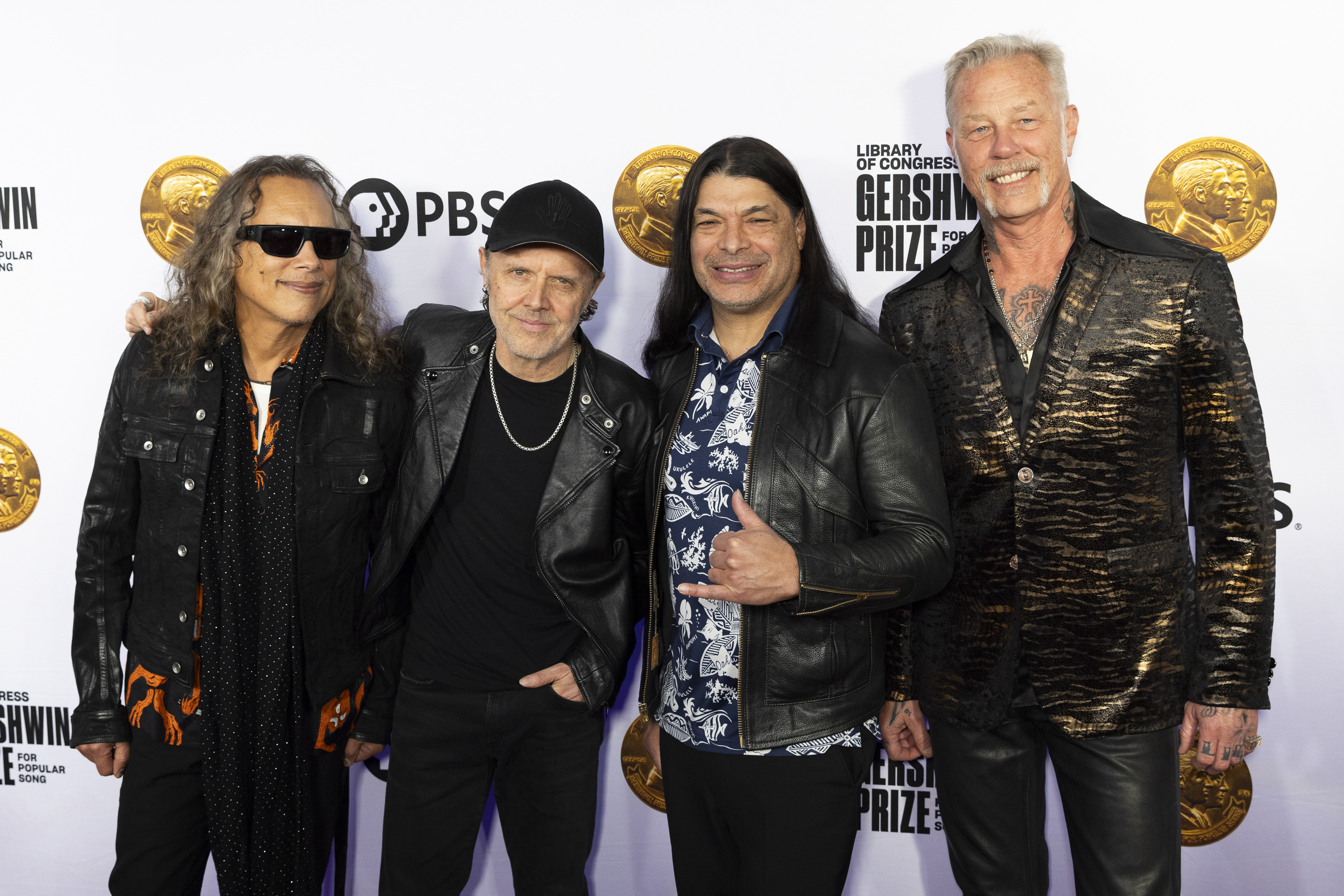
- Metallica at the 2024 Gershwin Prize ceremony. From left to right: Kirk Hammett, Lars Ulrich, Robert Trujillo and James Hetfield.

Background information
- Origin: Los Angeles, California, U.S.
- Genres: Heavy metal; thrash metal; speed metal; hard rock
- Works: Discography; songs; tours
- Years active: 1981–present
- Labels: Megaforce; Elektra; Vertigo; Warner Bros.; Blackened
- Spinoffs: Megadeth; Phantasm
- Spinoff of: Leather Charm
- Awards: Full list
- Members: James Hetfield; Lars Ulrich; Kirk Hammett; Robert Trujillo
- Past members: Ron McGovney; Dave Mustaine; Cliff Burton; Jason Newsted
- Website: metallica.com

Metallica is an American heavy metal band. It was formed in Los Angeles in 1981 by vocalist/guitarist James Hetfield and drummer Lars Ulrich, and has been based in San Francisco for most of its career. The band's fast tempos, instrumentals and aggressive musicianship made them one of the founding "big four" bands of thrash metal, alongside Megadeth, Anthrax and Slayer. Metallica's current lineup comprises founding members and primary songwriters Hetfield and Ulrich, longtime lead guitarist Kirk Hammett and bassist Robert Trujillo. Former members of the band are bassists Ron McGovney, Cliff Burton and Jason Newsted, as well as guitarist Dave Mustaine, who formed Megadeth after being fired from Metallica in 1983.

Metallica first found commercial success with the release of its third album, Master of Puppets (1986), which is often cited as one of the best metal albums of all time. The band's next album, ...And Justice for All (1988), gave Metallica its first Grammy Award nomination. Its fifth album, Metallica (1991), was a turning point for the band that saw it transition from its thrash metal roots; the album appealed to a more mainstream audience, achieving substantial commercial success and selling more than 16 million copies in the United States to date, making it the best-selling album of the SoundScan era. After experimenting with different genres and directions in subsequent releases, Metallica returned to its thrash metal roots with its ninth album, Death Magnetic (2008), which drew similar praise to that of the band's earlier albums. The band's latest album, 72 Seasons, was released in 2023.

In 2000, Metallica led the case against the peer-to-peer file sharing service Napster, in which the band and several other artists filed lawsuits against the service for sharing their copyright-protected material without consent, eventually reaching a settlement. Metallica was the subject of the acclaimed 2004 documentary film Metallica: Some Kind of Monster, which documented the troubled production of the band's eighth album, St. Anger (2003), and the internal struggles within the band at the time. In 2009, Metallica was inducted into the Rock and Roll Hall of Fame. The band co-wrote the screenplay for and starred alongside Dane DeHaan in the 2013 concert film Metallica: Through the Never, in which the band performed live against a fictional thriller storyline.

Metallica is one of the most commercially successful bands of all time, having sold more than 163 million albums worldwide as of 2023, and is the third-best-selling music artist since Nielsen SoundScan began tracking sales in 1991, having sold 58 million albums in the United States as of 2017. The band has released eleven studio albums, four live albums (including two performances with the San Francisco Symphony), twelve video albums, one cover album, two extended plays, 37 singles and 39 music videos. Metallica has won ten Grammy Awards from 26 nominations and had six consecutive studio albums, from Metallica through Hardwired... to Self-Destruct (2016), debut at number one on the Billboard 200. Metallica has been listed as one of the greatest artists of all time by magazines such as Rolling Stone, which ranked the band in 61st place on its list of 100 greatest artists of all time.

== History ==
=== 1981–1984: Formation, early years, and Kill 'Em All ===
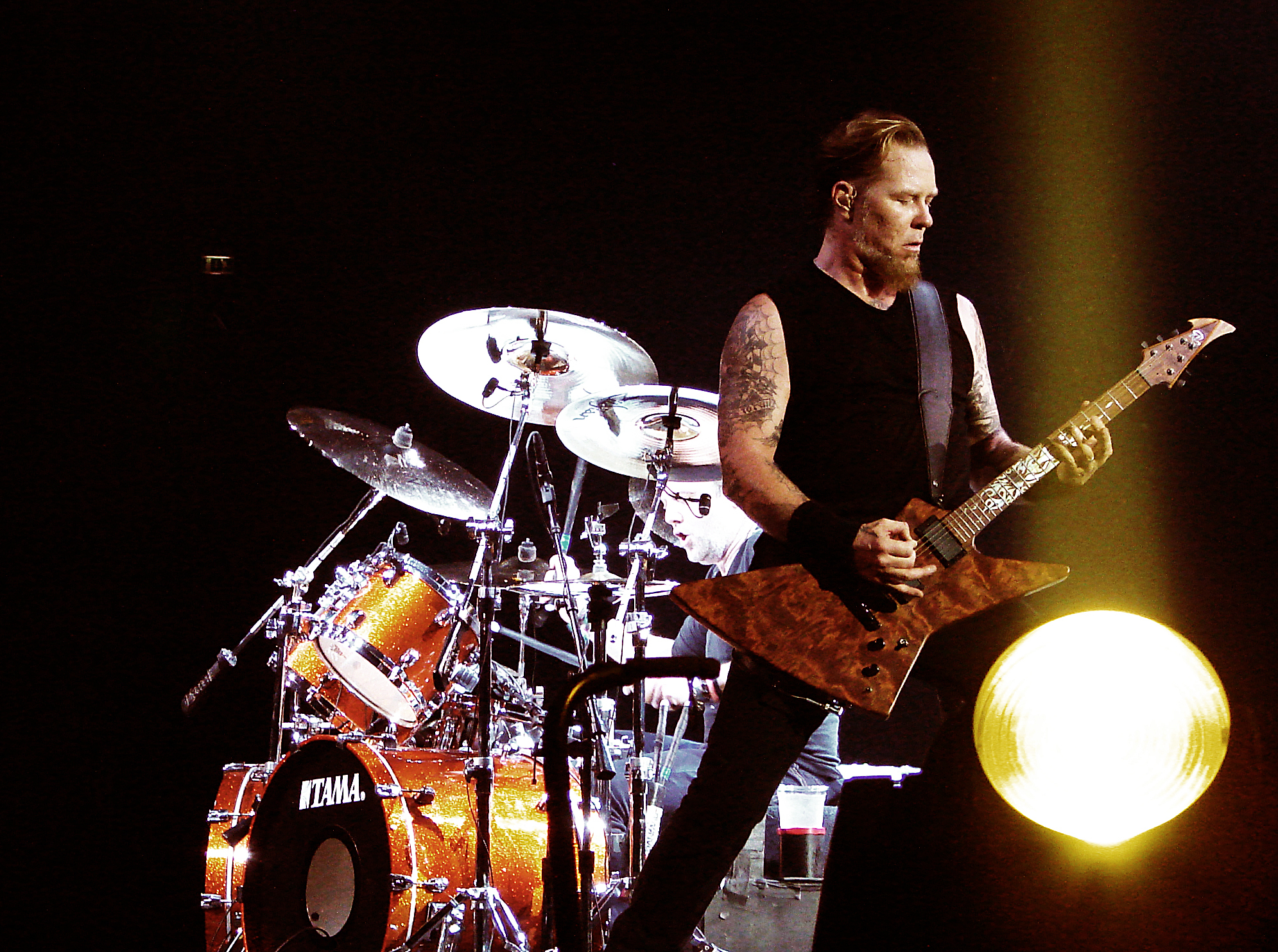
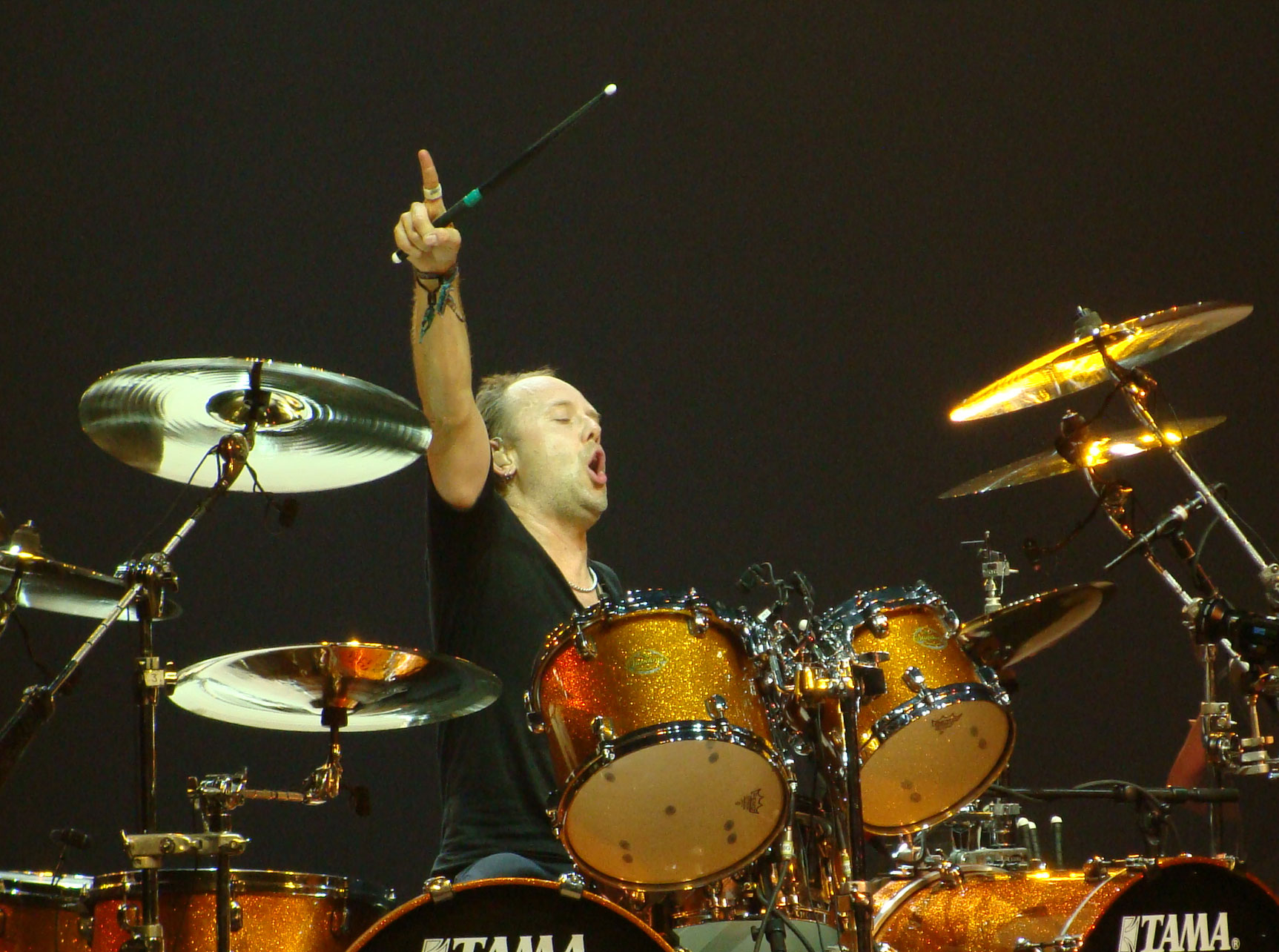
Metallica founding members James Hetfield (top) and Lars Ulrich

Metallica was formed in Los Angeles in late 1981 when Danish drummer Lars Ulrich placed an advertisement in a Los Angeles newspaper, The Recycler, in which the advertisement read, "Drummer looking for other metal musicians to jam with Tygers of Pan Tang, Diamond Head and Iron Maiden." Guitarists James Hetfield and Hugh Tanner of Leather Charm answered the advertisement. Although he had not formed a band, Ulrich asked Metal Blade Records founder Brian Slagel if he could record a song for the label's upcoming compilation album, Metal Massacre. Slagel accepted. The band was officially formed on October 28, 1981, five months after Ulrich and Hetfield first met.

The band name came from Ulrich's friend Ron Quintana, who was thinking of names for a fanzine and was considering MetalMania or Metallica. After hearing the two names, Ulrich wanted the latter for his band, so he suggested Quintana use MetalMania instead. Dave Mustaine replied to an advertisement for a lead guitarist; Ulrich and Hetfield recruited him after seeing his expensive guitar equipment.

Hetfield took vocal duties at the band's first gig, which took place in March 1982 at Radio City in Anaheim with newly recruited bassist Ron McGovney. They were chosen to open for British heavy metal band Saxon at the second gig of their 1982 U.S. tour.

Metallica recorded its first demo, Power Metal, whose name was inspired by McGovney's early business cards, in early 1982. The band played as a five-piece at their fourth gig, which took place in April 1982 in Costa Mesa with lead guitarist Brad Parker, though he did not last. According to Mustaine, the band was "fed up" with auditioning guitar players and Hetfield became the de facto guitarist, in addition to the vocalist. Hetfield played guitar live for the first time at the band's fifth gig, in May 1982. Metal Massacre I was released on June 14, 1982; early pressings listed the band incorrectly as "Mettallica", which angered the band. Hetfield sang and played both bass and rhythm guitar, while Lars Ulrich played drums and Lloyd Grant played a guitar solo.

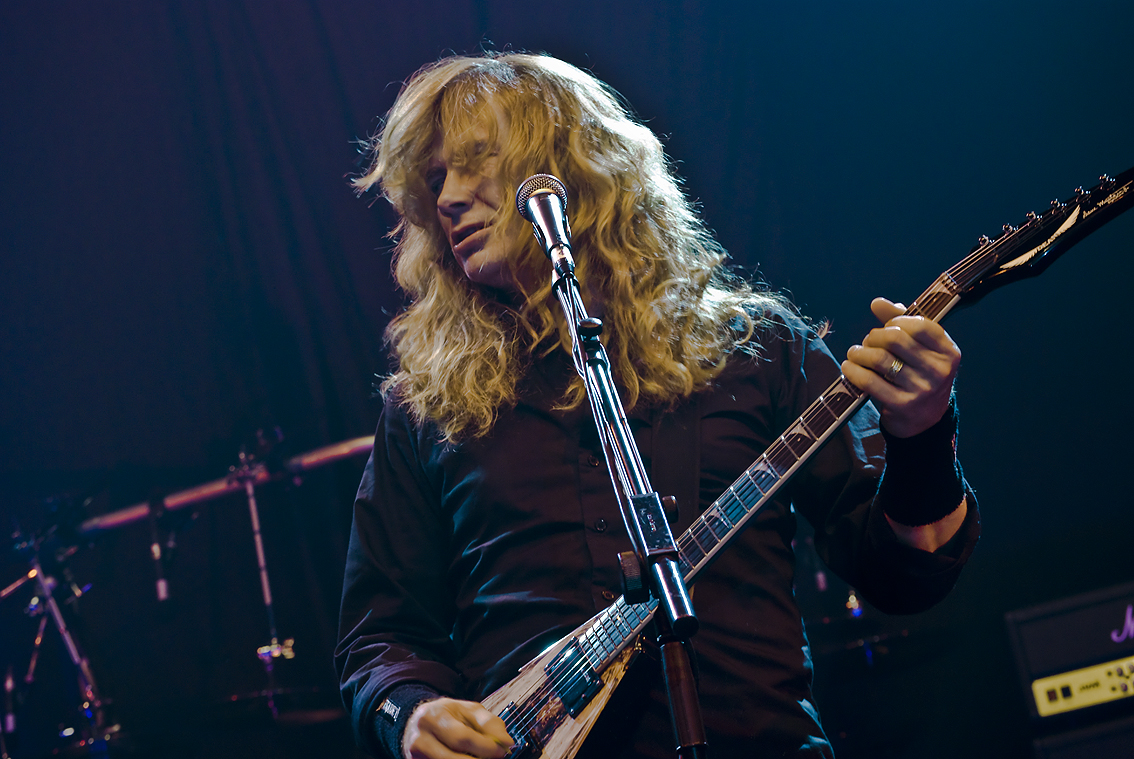
Dave Mustaine (pictured in 2009) went on to found rival band Megadeth after being fired from the band in 1983.

The term "thrash metal" was coined in February 1984 by Kerrang! journalist Malcolm Dome in reference to Anthrax's song "Metal Thrashing Mad". Prior to this, Hetfield referred to Metallica's sound as "power metal". In late 1982, Ulrich and Hetfield attended a show at the West Hollywood nightclub Whisky a Go Go, which featured bassist Cliff Burton in the band Trauma. The two were "blown away" by Burton's use of a wah-wah pedal and asked him to join Metallica. Hetfield and Mustaine wanted McGovney to leave because they thought he "didn't contribute anything, he just followed." Although Burton initially declined the offer, by the end of the year, he had accepted on the condition that the band move to El Cerrito in the San Francisco Bay Area. Metallica's first live performance with Burton was at the nightclub The Stone in March 1983, and the first recording to feature Burton was the Megaforce demo (1983).

Metallica was ready to record their debut album, but when Metal Blade was unable to cover the cost, they began looking for other options. Concert promoter Jonathan "Jonny Z" Zazula, who had heard the demo No Life 'til Leather (1982), offered to broker a record deal between Metallica and New York City–based record labels. After those record labels showed no interest, Zazula borrowed enough money to cover the recording budget and signed Metallica to his own label, Megaforce Records.

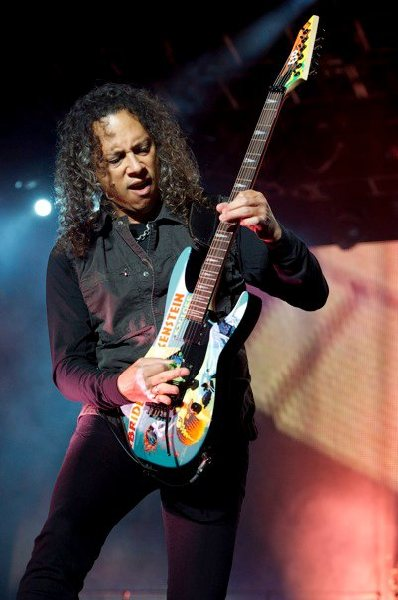
Kirk Hammett (pictured in 2010) replaced Mustaine in 1983, and has been with the band ever since.

In May 1983, Metallica traveled to Rochester, New York, to record its debut album, Metal Up Your Ass, which was produced by Paul Curcio. The other members decided to eject Mustaine from the band because of his drug and alcohol abuse and violent behavior just before the recording sessions on April 11, 1983. Exodus guitarist Kirk Hammett replaced Mustaine the same afternoon. Metallica's first live performance with Hammett was on April 16, 1983, at a nightclub in Dover, New Jersey, called The Showplace; the support act was Anthrax, which included Dan Lilker and Neil Turbin. This was the first time the two bands performed live together.

Mustaine, who went on to form Megadeth, has expressed his dislike for Hammett in interviews, saying Hammett "stole" his job.

Because of conflicts with its record label and the distributors' refusal to release an album titled Metal Up Your Ass, the album was renamed Kill 'Em All. It was released on Megaforce Records in the U.S. and on Music for Nations in Europe, and peaked at number 155 on the Billboard 200 in 1986. (Note: The 1988 re-issue of Kill 'Em All on Elektra Records also charted on the Billboard 200, peaking at number 120.) Although the album was not initially a financial success, it earned Metallica a growing fan base in the underground metal scene. To support the release, Metallica embarked on the Kill 'Em All for One tour with Raven. In February 1984, Metallica supported Venom on the Seven Dates of Hell tour, during which the bands performed in front of 7,000 people at the Aardschok Festival in Zwolle, Netherlands.

=== 1984–1986: Ride the Lightning, Master of Puppets, and Burton's death ===
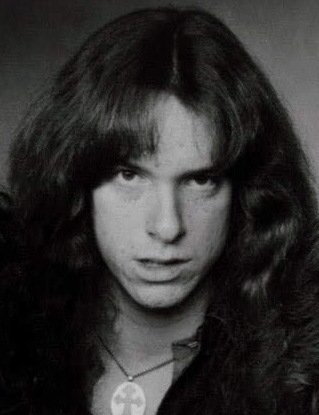
Cliff Burton (pictured in 1983) replaced Ron McGovney as the bassist in 1982 and played with the band until his death in 1986.

Metallica recorded its second studio album, Ride the Lightning, at Sweet Silence Studios in Copenhagen, Denmark, from February to March 1984. It was released on July 27, 1984 and reached number 100 on the Billboard 200. A French printing press mistakenly printed green covers for the album, which are now considered collector's items. Mustaine received writing co-credit for "Ride the Lightning" and "The Call of Ktulu".

Elektra Records A&R director Michael Alago and co-founder of Q Prime management, Cliff Burnstein, attended a Metallica concert in September 1984; they were impressed with the performance, signed Metallica to Elektra and made the band a client of Q Prime. Metallica's growing success was such that the band's British label, Music for Nations, released "Creeping Death" as a limited-edition single, which sold 40,000 copies as an import in the U.S. Two of the three songs on the record – cover versions of Diamond Head's "Am I Evil?" and Blitzkrieg's "Blitzkrieg" – appeared on the 1988 Elektra reissue of Kill 'Em All. Metallica embarked on its first major European tour with Tank to an average crowd of 1,300. Returning to the U.S., it embarked on a co-headlining tour with W.A.S.P. and support from Armored Saint. Metallica played its largest show at the Monsters of Rock festival at Donington Park, England, on August 17, 1985, with Bon Jovi and Ratt, playing to 70,000 people. At a show in Oakland, California, at the Day on the Green festival, the band played to a crowd of 60,000.

Metallica's third studio album, Master of Puppets, was recorded at Sweet Silence Studios from September to December 1985 and released on March 3, 1986. The album reached number 29 on the Billboard 200 and spent 72 weeks on the chart. It was the band's first album to be certified Gold on November 4, 1986, and was certified eight times Platinum in 2025. Steve Huey of AllMusic considered the album "the band's greatest achievement". Following the release of the album, Metallica supported Ozzy Osbourne on a U.S. tour. Hetfield broke his wrist while skateboarding; he continued with the tour, performing vocals, with guitar technician John Marshall playing rhythm guitar.

On September 27, 1986, during the European leg of Metallica's Damage, Inc. Tour, members drew cards to determine which bunks on the tour bus they would sleep in. Burton won and chose to sleep in Hammett's bunk. At around sunrise near Dörarp, Sweden, the bus driver lost control and skidded, which caused the bus to overturn several times. Ulrich, Hammett and Hetfield sustained no serious injuries; however, Burton was pinned under the bus and died. Hetfield said:

I saw the bus lying right on him. I saw his legs sticking out. I freaked. The bus driver, I recall, was trying to yank the blanket out from under him to use for other people. I just went, "Don't fucking do that!" I already wanted to kill the [bus driver]. I don't know if he was drunk or if he hit some ice. All I knew was, he was driving and Cliff wasn't alive anymore.

=== 1986–1994: Newsted joins, ...And Justice for All and Metallica ===
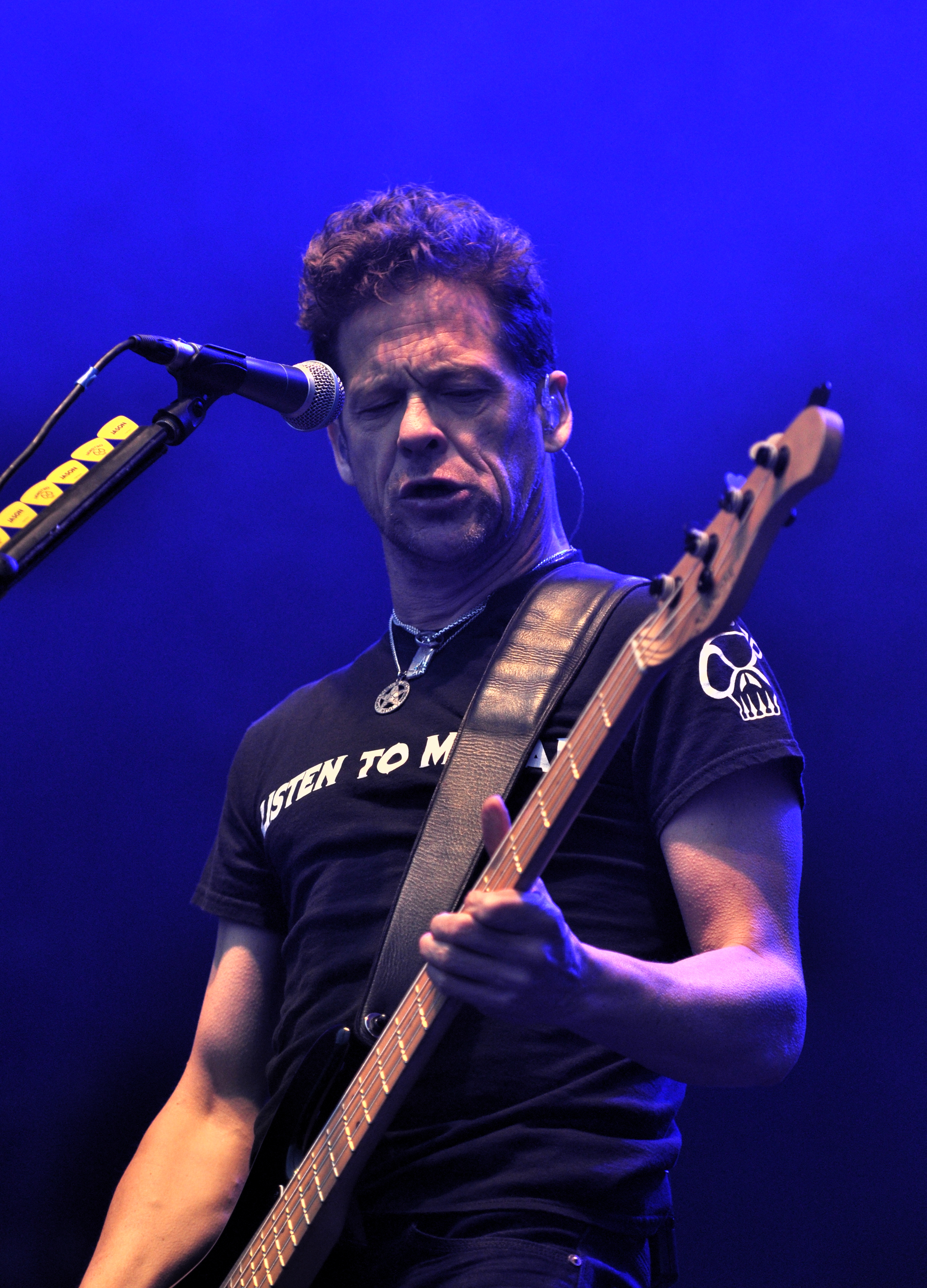
Jason Newsted (pictured in 2013) joined Metallica soon after Cliff Burton's death in 1986.

Burton's death left Metallica's future in doubt. The three remaining members decided Burton would want them to carry on, and with the Burton family's blessings, the band sought a replacement. Roughly 40 people – including Hammett's childhood friend, Les Claypool of Primus; Troy Gregory of Prong; and Jason Newsted, formerly of Flotsam and Jetsam – auditioned for the band to fill Burton's spot. Newsted learned Metallica's entire setlist; after the audition, Metallica invited him to Tommy's Joynt in San Francisco. Hetfield, Ulrich and Hammett decided on Newsted as Burton's replacement; his first live performance with Metallica was at the Country Club in Reseda, California. The members initiated Newsted by tricking him into eating a ball of wasabi. The band finished its tour in February 1987.

After Newsted joined Metallica, the band left their El Cerrito practice space – a suburban house formerly rented by sound engineer Mark Whitaker and dubbed "the Metalli-mansion" – and relocated to the adjacent cities of Berkeley and Albany before eventually settling in the Marin County city of San Rafael, north of San Francisco. In March 1987, Hetfield again broke his wrist while skateboarding, forcing the band to cancel an appearance on Saturday Night Live. On August 21, 1987, an all-covers extended play (EP), titled The $5.98 E.P. - Garage Days Re-Revisited, was released. The EP was recorded in an effort to use the band's newly constructed recording studio, test Newsted's talents, and to relieve grief and stress following the death of Burton. A video titled Cliff 'Em All commemorating Burton's three years in Metallica was released in 1987; the video included bass solos, home videos and pictures.

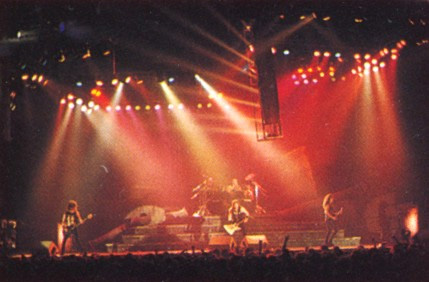
Metallica performing during its Damaged Justice Tour in 1988

Metallica's first studio album since Burton's death, ...And Justice for All, was recorded from January to May 1988 and released in September. The album had its world premiere by DJ Chuck Kaye (aka The Roar of L'Amour) at the Brooklyn venue L'Amour where Metallica played numerous times (including their last show with Mustaine). The album was a commercial success, reaching number 6 on the Billboard 200, and was the band's first album to enter the top 10. The album was certified Platinum nine weeks after its release. There were complaints about the production, however; Steve Huey of AllMusic said Ulrich's drums were clicking more than thudding, and the guitars "buzz thinly". The lack of audible bass in the album also drew widespread criticism. To promote the album, Metallica embarked on a tour called Damaged Justice.

In 1989, Metallica received its first Grammy Award nomination for ...And Justice for All in the new Best Hard Rock/Metal Performance Vocal or Instrument category. Metallica was the favorite to win, but the award was given to Jethro Tull for the album Crest of a Knave. The award was controversial with fans and the press; Metallica was standing off-stage waiting to receive the award after performing the song "One". Jethro Tull had been advised by its manager not to attend the ceremony because he was expecting Metallica to win. The award was named in Entertainment Weekly's "Grammy's 10 Biggest Upsets" list.

Following the release of ...And Justice for All, Metallica released its debut music video for the song "One", which the band performed in an abandoned warehouse. The footage was remixed with the film Johnny Got His Gun. Rather than organize an ongoing licensing deal, Metallica purchased the rights to the film. The remixed video was submitted to MTV with an alternative, performance-only version that was held back in case MTV banned the remixed version. MTV accepted the remixed version; the video was viewers' first exposure to Metallica. In 1999, it was voted number 38 in MTV's "Top 100 Videos of All Time" countdown and was featured on the network's 25th-anniversary edition of ADD Video, which showcased the most popular videos on MTV in the last 25 years.

In October 1990, Metallica entered One on One Recording's studio in North Hollywood to record its next album. Bob Rock, who had worked with Aerosmith, the Cult, Bon Jovi and Mötley Crüe, was hired as the producer. Metallica – also known as The Black Album – was remixed three times, cost US$1 million, and ended Hammett and Ulrich's marriages. Although the release was delayed until 1991, Metallica debuted at number one in 10 countries, selling 650,000 units in the U.S. during its first week. The album marked a change in Metallica's musical style and brought the band mainstream attention; it has been certified 16 times Platinum in the U.S., which makes it the 25th-best-selling album in the country. The making of Metallica and the following tour was documented in A Year and a Half in the Life of Metallica. The tour in support of the album, called the Wherever We May Roam Tour, lasted 14 months and included dates in the U.S., Japan and the U.K. In September 1991, up to 1.6 million rock music fans converged in Moscow to enjoy the first open-air rock concert to be held in the Soviet Union; it was part of the Monsters of Rock series and Wherever We May Roam Tour. (Note: Estimates of attendance vary between 150,000, 500,000 and 1.6 million.) In April 1992, Metallica appeared at The Freddie Mercury Tribute Concert and performed a three-song set. Hetfield later performed "Stone Cold Crazy" with the remaining members of Queen and Tony Iommi.

On August 8, 1992, during the co-headlining Guns N' Roses/Metallica Stadium Tour at the Olympic Stadium in Montreal, Hetfield suffered second and third-degree burns to his arms, face, hands and legs. There had been some confusion with the new pyrotechnics setup, which resulted in Hetfield walking into a 12-foot (3.7 m) flame during "Fade to Black". Newsted said Hetfield's skin was "bubbling like on The Toxic Avenger". Metallica returned to the stage seventeen days later with guitar technician and Metal Church member John Marshall replacing Hetfield on guitar for the remainder of the tour, although Hetfield was able to sing. Later in 1993, Metallica went on the Nowhere Else to Roam Tour, playing five shows in Mexico City. Live Shit: Binge & Purge, the band's first box set, was released in November 1993. The collection contains three live CDs, three home videos, and a book filled with riders and letters.

=== 1994–2001: Load, Reload, Napster controversy and Newsted's departure ===
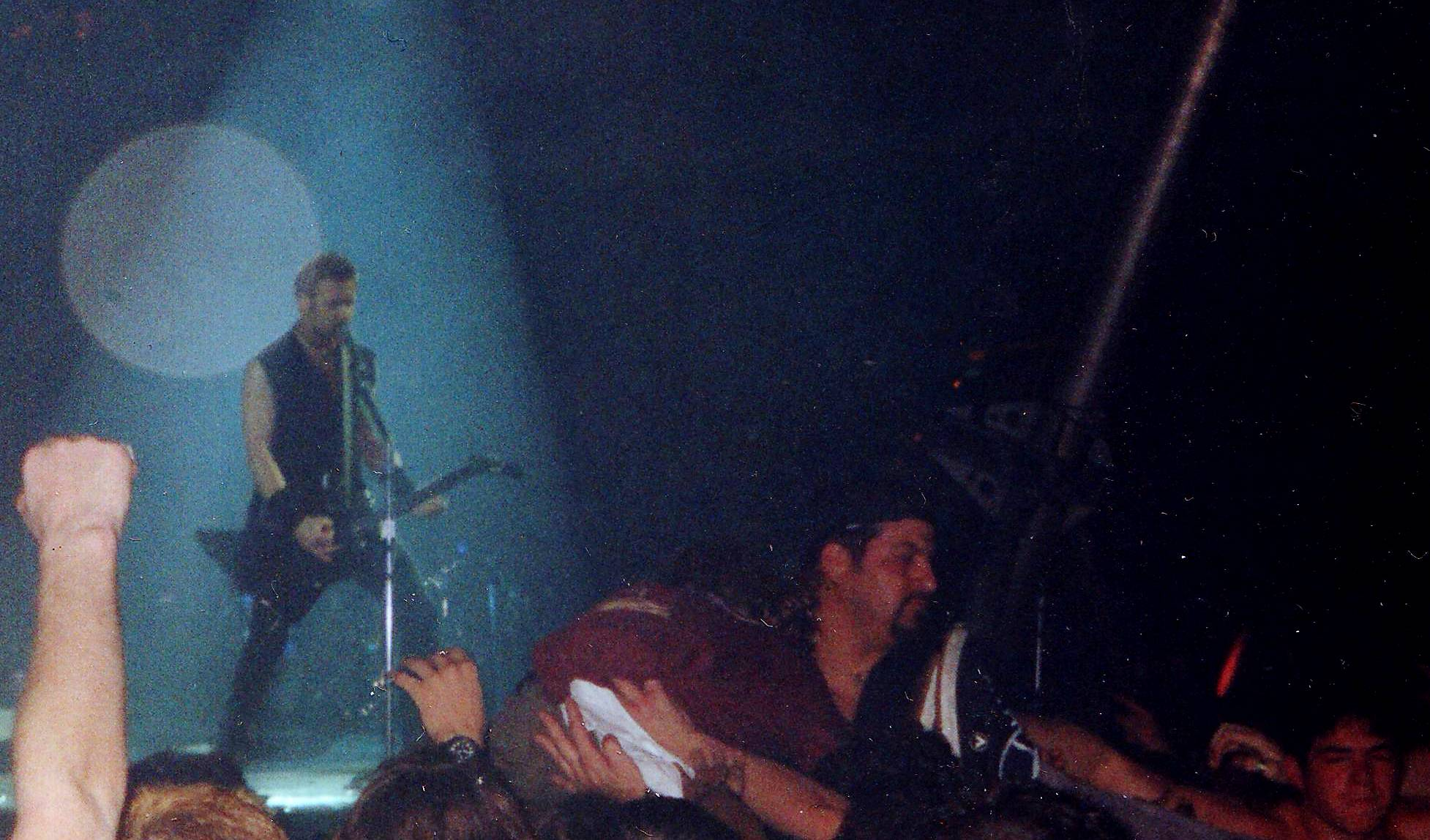
James Hetfield performing with the band during its tour for Load in 1996

After almost three years of touring to promote Metallica, including a headlining performance at Woodstock '94, Metallica returned to the studio to write and record its sixth studio album. The band went on a brief hiatus in the summer of 1995 and played a short tour, Escape from the Studio '95, which comprised three outdoor shows, including a headline show at Donington Park supported by Slayer, Skid Row, Slash's Snakepit, Therapy? and Corrosion of Conformity. The band spent about a year writing and recording new songs, resulting in the release of Load in 1996. Load debuted at number one on the Billboard 200 and ARIA Charts; it was the band's second number one album. The cover art, Blood and Semen III, was created by Andres Serrano, who pressed a mixture of his own semen and blood between sheets of plexiglass. The release saw another change in the band's musical direction and a new image, which included a revamped logo and the band members having their hair cut. While Load was a commercial success, the band's change in style had polarized their fanbase. Metallica headlined the alternative rock festival Lollapalooza festival in mid-1996.

During the early production of Load, the band had recorded enough material to fill a double album. It was decided that half of the songs were to be released; the band would continue to work on the remaining songs and release them the following year. This resulted in follow-up album, titled Reload. The cover art was again created by Serrano, this time using a mixture of blood and urine. Reload, too, debuted at number one on the Billboard 200 and reached number two on the Top Canadian Album chart. Hetfield said in the 2004 documentary film Metallica: Some Kind of Monster that the band initially thought some of the songs on these albums were of average quality; these were "polished and reworked" until judged releasable. To promote Reload, Metallica performed "Fuel" and "The Memory Remains" with Marianne Faithfull on NBC's Saturday Night Live in December 1997.

In 1998, Metallica compiled a double album of cover songs, titled Garage Inc. The first disc contained newly recorded covers of songs by Diamond Head, Killing Joke, the Misfits, Thin Lizzy, Mercyful Fate, Black Sabbath and others, and the second disc featured the original version of The $5.98 E.P. – Garage Days Re-Revisited, which had become a scarce collector's item. The album entered the Billboard 200 at number two.

On April 21 and 22, 1999, Metallica recorded two performances with the San Francisco Symphony, which was conducted by Michael Kamen, who had previously worked with producer Rock on "Nothing Else Matters". Kamen approached Metallica in 1991 with the idea of pairing the band's music with a symphony orchestra. Kamen and his staff of over 100 composed additional orchestral material for Metallica songs. Metallica wrote two new Kamen-scored songs for the event: "No Leaf Clover" and "-Human". The audio recording and concert footage were released in 1999 as the album and concert film S&M. It entered the Billboard 200 at number two and the Australian ARIA charts and Top Internet Albums chart at number one.

In 2000, Metallica discovered that a demo of its song "I Disappear", which was supposed to be released in combination with the Mission: Impossible II soundtrack, was receiving radio airplay. Tracing the source of the leak, the band found the file on the Napster peer-to-peer file-sharing network and also found that the band's entire catalogue was freely available. Metallica filed a lawsuit at the U.S. District Court, Central District of California, alleging that Napster violated three areas of the law: copyright infringement, unlawful use of digital audio interface device and the Racketeer Influenced and Corrupt Organizations Act (RICO).

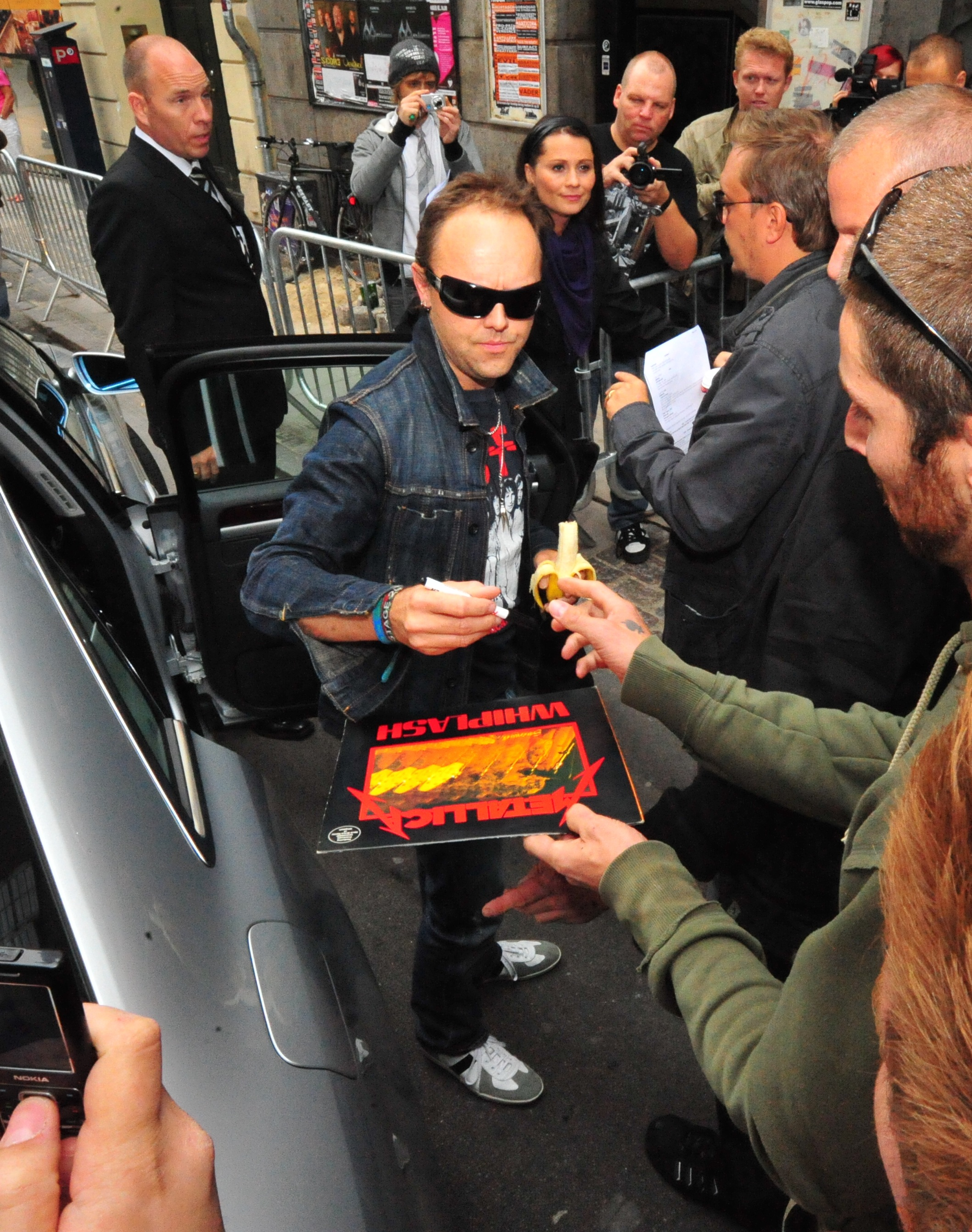
Lars Ulrich led the case against Napster for Metallica.

Ulrich provided a statement to the Senate Judiciary Committee regarding copyright infringement on July 11, 2000. Federal Judge Marilyn Hall Patel ordered the site to place a filter on the program within 72 hours or be shut down. A settlement between Metallica and Napster was reached when German media conglomerate Bertelsmann BMG showed interest in purchasing the rights to Napster for $94 million. Under the terms of settlement, Napster agreed to block users who shared music by artists who do not want their music shared. On June 3, 2002, Napster filed for Chapter 11 protection under U.S. bankruptcy laws. On September 3, 2002, an American bankruptcy judge blocked the sale of Napster to Bertelsmann and forced Napster to liquidate its assets, according to Chapter 7 of the U.S. bankruptcy laws.

At the 2000 MTV Video Music Awards, Ulrich appeared with host Marlon Wayans in a skit that criticized the idea of using Napster to share music. Wayans played a college student listening to Metallica's "I Disappear". Ulrich walked in and asked for an explanation, and he responded to Wayans' excuse that using Napster was just "sharing" by saying that Wayans' idea of sharing was "borrowing things that were not yours without asking." He called in the Metallica road crew, who proceeded to confiscate all of Wayans' belongings, leaving him almost naked in an empty room. Napster creator Shawn Fanning responded later in the ceremony by presenting an award wearing a Metallica shirt that read: "I borrowed this shirt from a friend. Maybe, if I like it, I'll buy one of my own." Ulrich was later booed on stage at the award show when he introduced the final musical act, Blink-182.

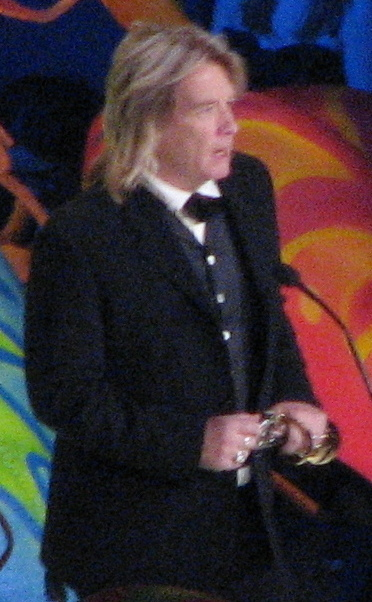
Longtime producer Bob Rock recorded bass for St. Anger following Jason Newsted's departure in 2001.

Newsted left Metallica on January 17, 2001, just as plans were being made to enter the recording studio. He said he left the band for "private and personal reasons, and the physical damage I have done to myself over the years while playing the music that I love." During a Playboy interview with Metallica, Newsted said he wanted to release an album with his side project, Echobrain. Hetfield was opposed to the idea and said, "When someone does a side project, it takes away from the strength of Metallica" and that a side project is "like cheating on your wife in a way." Newsted said Hetfield had recorded vocals for a song used in the film South Park: Bigger, Longer & Uncut, and appeared on one Corrosion of Conformity album, Wiseblood. Hetfield replied: "My name isn't on those records. And I'm not out trying to sell them" and raised questions such as, "Where would it end? Does he start touring with it? Does he sell shirts? Is it his band?"

=== 2001–2006: Some Kind of Monster, St. Anger, and Trujillo joins ===
In April 2001, filmmakers Joe Berlinger and Bruce Sinofsky began following Metallica to document the recording process of the band's next studio album. Over two years they recorded more than 1,000 hours of footage. On July 19, 2001, before preparations to enter the recording studio, Hetfield entered rehab to treat his "alcoholism and other addictions". All recording plans were put on hold and the band's future was in doubt. Hetfield left rehab on December 4, 2001, and the band returned to the recording studio on April 12, 2002. Hetfield was required to limit his work to four hours a day between noon and 4 pm, and to spend the rest of his time with his family. The footage recorded by Berlinger and Sinofsky was compiled into the documentary Metallica: Some Kind of Monster, which premiered at the Sundance Film Festival in January 2004. In the documentary, Newsted said his former bandmates' decision to hire a therapist to help solve their problems which he felt they could have solved on their own was "really fucking lame and weak".

In June 2003, Metallica's eighth studio album, St. Anger, debuted at number one on the Billboard 200, and drew mixed reactions from critics. Ulrich's "steely" sounding snare drum and the absence of guitar solos received particular criticism. Kevin Forest Moreau of Shakingthrough.net said, "the guitars stumble in a monotone of mid-level, processed rattle; the drums don't propel as much as struggle to disguise an all-too-turgid pace; and the rage is both unfocused and leavened with too much narcissistic navel-gazing". Brent DiCrescenzo of Pitchfork described it as "an utter mess". However, Blender magazine called it the "grimiest and grimmest of the band's Bob Rock productions", and New York Magazine called it "utterly raw and rocking". The title track, "St. Anger", won the Grammy Award for Best Metal Performance in 2004; it was used as the official theme song for WWE's SummerSlam 2003.

For the duration of St. Anger's recording period, producer Bob Rock played bass on the album and in several live shows at which Metallica performed during that time. Once the record was completed, the band started to hold auditions for Newsted's permanent replacement. Bassists Pepper Keenan, Jeordie White, Scott Reeder, Eric Avery, Danny Lohner, and Chris Wyse—among others—auditioned for the role. After three months of auditions, Robert Trujillo, formerly of Suicidal Tendencies and Ozzy Osbourne's band, was chosen as the new bassist. Newsted, who had joined Canadian thrash metal band Voivod by that time, was Trujillo's replacement in Osbourne's band during the 2003 Ozzfest tour, which included Voivod.

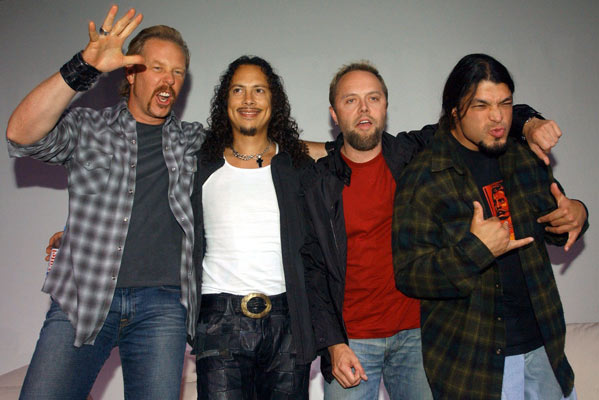
After the recording of St. Anger, Robert Trujillo, furthest right, joined Metallica in 2003.

Before the band's set at the 2004 Download Festival, Ulrich was rushed to the hospital after having an anxiety seizure and was unable to perform. Hetfield searched for last-minute volunteers to replace Ulrich. Slayer drummer Dave Lombardo and Slipknot drummer Joey Jordison volunteered. Lombardo performed "Battery" and "The Four Horsemen", Ulrich's drum technician Flemming Larsen performed "Fade to Black", and Jordison performed the remainder of the set. Having toured for two years in support of St. Anger on the Summer Sanitarium Tour 2003 and the Madly in Anger with the World Tour, with multi-platinum rock band Godsmack in support, Metallica took a break from performing and spent most of 2005 with friends and family. The band opened for the Rolling Stones at SBC Park in San Francisco on November 13 and 15, 2005.

=== 2006–2013: Death Magnetic and Rock and Roll Hall of Fame induction ===
In February 2006, Metallica announced on its official website that after 15 years, long-time producer Bob Rock would not be producing the band's next studio album. Instead, the band chose to work with producer Rick Rubin. Around the same time, a petition signed by 1,500 fans was posted online in an attempt to encourage the band to prohibit Rock from producing Metallica albums, saying he had too much influence on the band's sound and musical direction. Rock said the petition hurt his children's feelings; he said, "sometimes, even with a great coach, a team keeps losing. You have to get new blood in there."

In December 2006, Metallica released a DVD titled The Videos 1989–2004, which sold 28,000 copies in its first week and entered the Billboard Top Videos chart at number three. Metallica recorded a guitar-based interpretation of Ennio Morricone's "The Ecstasy of Gold" for a tribute album titled We All Love Ennio Morricone, which was released in February 2007. The track received a Grammy nomination at the 50th Grammy Awards for the category "Best Rock Instrumental Performance". A recording of "The Ecstasy of Gold" has been played to introduce Metallica's performances since the 1980s.

Metallica scheduled the release of the album Death Magnetic as September 12, 2008, and the band filmed a music video for the album's first single, "The Day That Never Comes". On September 2, 2008, a record store in France began selling copies of Death Magnetic nearly two weeks before its scheduled worldwide release date, which resulted in the album being made available on peer-to-peer clients. This prompted the band's UK distributor Vertigo Records to officially release the album on September 10, 2008. Rumors of Metallica or Warner Bros. taking legal action against the French retailer were unconfirmed, though drummer Lars Ulrich responded to the leak by saying, "... We're ten days from release. I mean, from here, we're golden. If this thing leaks all over the world today or tomorrow, happy days. Happy days. Trust me", and, "By 2008 standards, that's a victory. If you'd told me six months ago that our record wouldn't leak until 10 days out, I would have signed up for that."

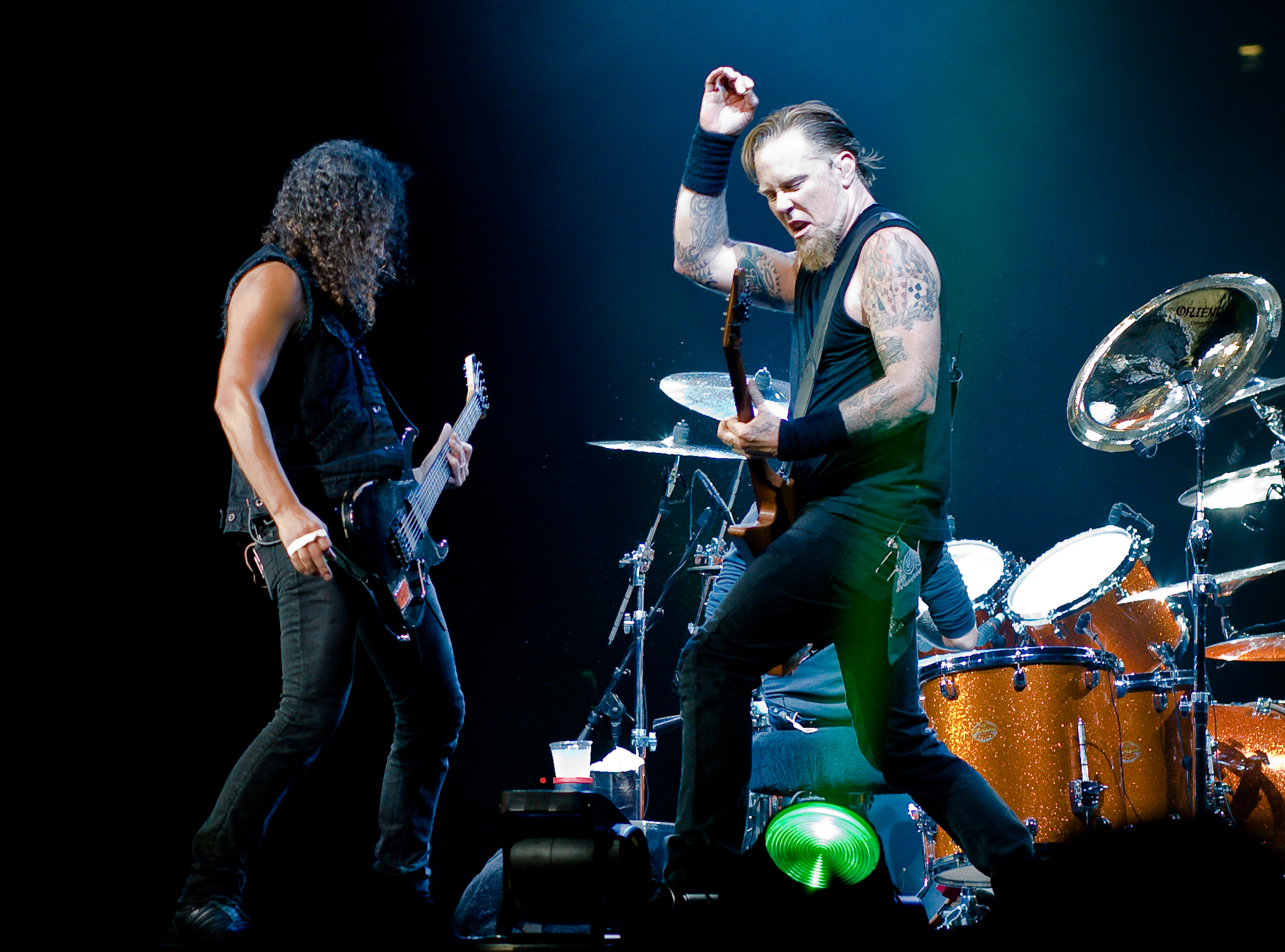
Metallica performing in London in 2008

Death Magnetic marked a return to the band's traditional thrash metal sound. The album debuted at number one in the U.S., selling 490,000 units; Metallica became the first band to have five consecutive studio albums debut at number one in the history of the Billboard 200. A week after its release, Death Magnetic remained at number one on the Billboard 200 and the European album chart; it also became the fastest selling album of 2008 in Australia. Death Magnetic remained at number one on the Billboard 200 album chart for three consecutive weeks. Metallica was one of two artists whose album—the other being Jack Johnson's album Sleep Through the Static—remained on the Billboard 200 for three consecutive weeks at number one in 2008. Death Magnetic also remained at number one on Billboard's Hard Rock, Modern Rock/Alternative and Rock album charts for five consecutive weeks. The album reached number one in 32 countries outside the U.S., including the UK, Canada, and Australia. In November 2008, Metallica's record deal with Warner Bros. ended and the band considered releasing its next album through the internet.

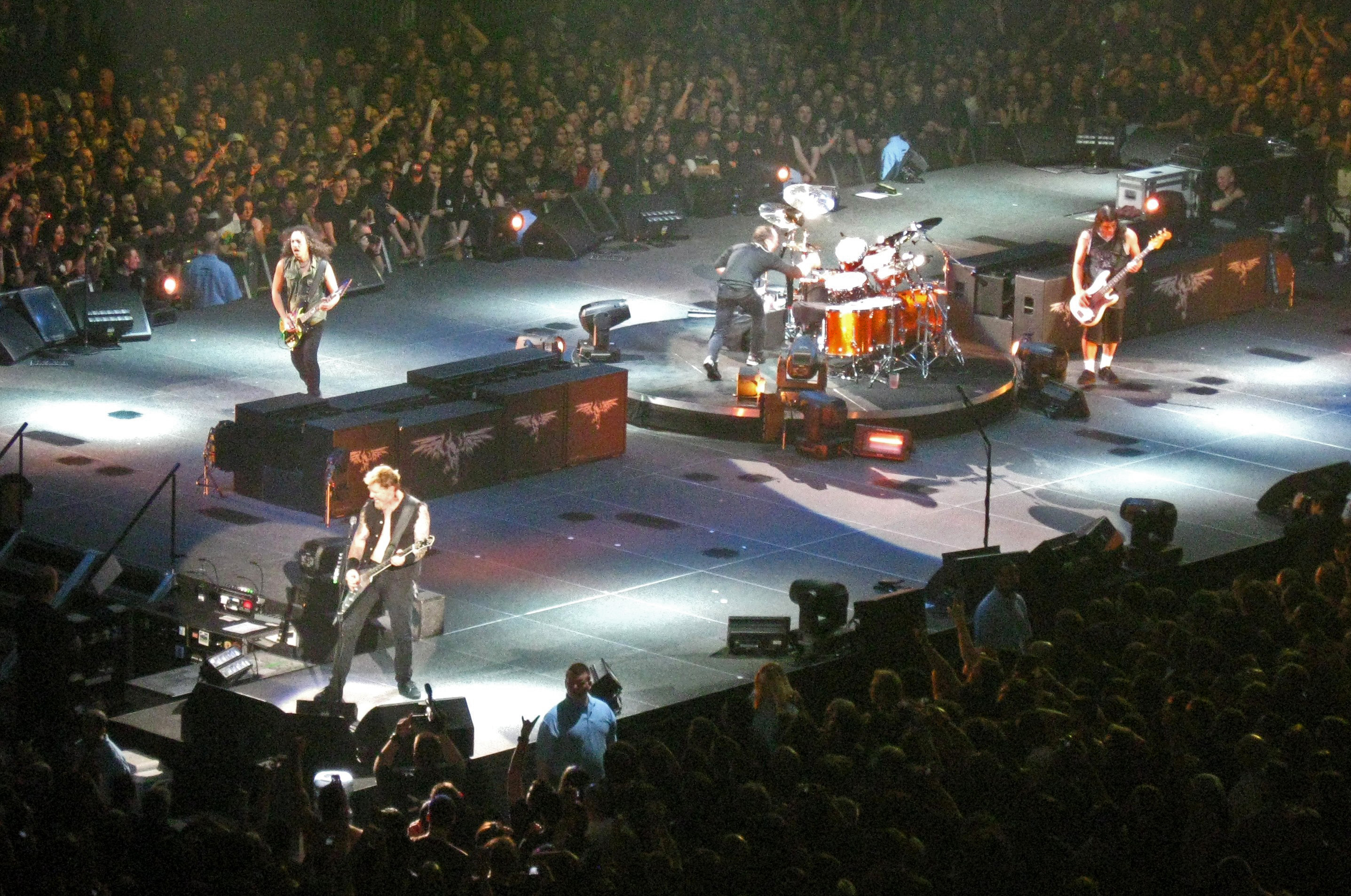
Metallica performing in London in 2009

On January 14, 2009, it was announced that Metallica would be inducted into the Rock and Roll Hall of Fame on April 4, 2009, and that former bassist Jason Newsted—who left the band in 2001—would perform with the band at the ceremony. Initially, it was announced that the matter had been discussed and that bassist Trujillo had agreed not to play because he "wanted to see the Black Album band". However, during the band's set of "Master of Puppets" and "Enter Sandman", both Trujillo and Newsted were on stage. Ray Burton, father of the late Cliff Burton, accepted the honor on his behalf. Although he was not to be inducted with them, Metallica invited Dave Mustaine to take part in the induction ceremony. Mustaine declined because of his touring commitments in Europe.

Metallica, Slayer, Megadeth, and Anthrax performed on the same bill for the first time on June 16, 2010, at Warsaw Babice Airport, Poland, as a part of the Sonisphere Festival series. The show in Sofia, Bulgaria, on June 22, 2010, was broadcast via satellite to cinemas. The bands also played concerts in Bucharest on June 26, 2010, and Istanbul on June 27, 2010. On June 28, 2010, Death Magnetic was certified double platinum by the RIAA. Metallica's World Magnetic Tour ended in Melbourne on November 21, 2010. The band had been touring for more than two years in support of Death Magnetic. To accompany the final tour dates in Australia and New Zealand, a live, limited edition EP of past performances in Australia called Six Feet Down Under was released. The EP was followed by Six Feet Down Under (Part II), which was released on November 12, 2010. Part 2 contains a further eight songs recorded during the first two Oceanic Legs of the World Magnetic Tour. On November 26, 2010, Metallica released a live EP titled Live at Grimey's, which was recorded in June 2008 at Grimey's Record Store, just before the band's appearance at Bonnaroo Music Festival that year.

In a June 2009 interview with Italy's Rock TV, Ulrich said Metallica was planning to continue touring until August 2010, and that there were no plans for a tenth album. He said he was sure the band would collaborate with producer Rick Rubin again. According to Blabbermouth.net, the band was considering recording its next album in the second half of 2011. In November 2010, during an interview with The Pulse of Radio, Ulrich said Metallica would return to writing in 2011. Ulrich said, "There's a bunch of balls in the air for 2011, but I think the main one is we really want to get back to writing again. We haven't really written since, what, '06, '07, and we want to get back to kind of just being creative again. Right now we are going to just chill out and then probably start up again in, I'd say, March or April, and start probably putting the creative cap back on and start writing some songs."

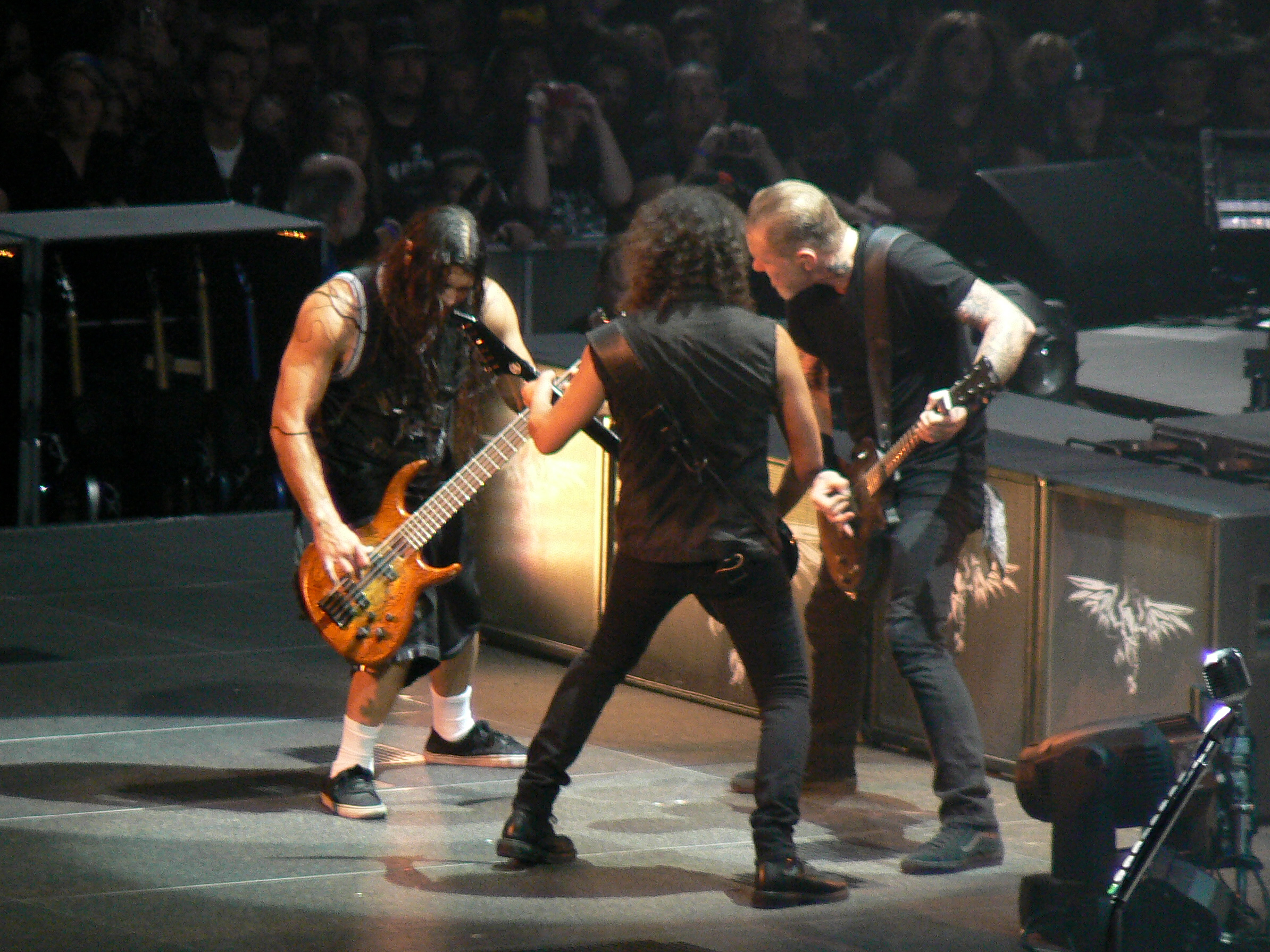
Metallica performing in Sacramento in 2009

On November 9, 2010, Metallica announced it would be headlining the Rock in Rio festival in Rio de Janeiro on September 25, 2011. On December 13, 2010, the band announced it would again play as part of the "big four" during the Sonisphere Festival at Knebworth House, Hertfordshire, on July 8, 2011. It was the first time all of the "big four" members played on the same stage in the UK. On December 17, 2010, Another "big four" Sonisphere performance that would take place in France on July 9 was announced. On January 25, 2011, another "big four" performance on April 23, 2011, at the Empire Polo Club in Indio, California, was announced. It was the first time all of the "big four" members played on the same stage in the U.S. On February 17, 2011, a show in Gelsenkirchen, Germany, on July 2, 2011, was announced. On February 22, a "big four" show in Milan on July 6, 2011, was announced. On March 2, 2011, another "big four" concert, which took place in Gothenburg on July 3, 2011, was announced. The final "big four" concert was in New York City, at Yankee Stadium, on September 14, 2011.

In an interview at the April 2011 Big Four concert, Robert Trujillo said Metallica will work with Rick Rubin again as producer for the new album and were "really excited to write some new music. There's no shortage of riffage in Metallica world right now." He added, "The first album with Rick was also the first album for me, so in a lot of ways, you're kind of testing the water. Now that we're comfortable with Rick and his incredible engineer, Greg Fidelman, who worked with Slayer, actually, on this last record—it's my hero—it's a great team. And it's only gonna better; I really believe that. So I'm super-excited." In June 2011, Rubin said Metallica had begun writing its new album.

On June 15, 2011, Metallica announced that recording sessions with singer-songwriter Lou Reed had concluded. The album, which was titled Lulu, was recorded over several months and comprised ten songs based on Frank Wedekind's "Lulu" plays Earth Spirit and Pandora's Box. The album was released on October 31, 2011. The recording of the album was problematic at times; Lars Ulrich later said Lou Reed challenged him to a "street fight". On October 16, 2011, Robert Trujillo confirmed that the band was back in the studio and writing new material. He said, "The writing process for the new Metallica album has begun. We've been in the studio with Rick Rubin, working on a couple of things, and we're going to be recording during the most of next year."

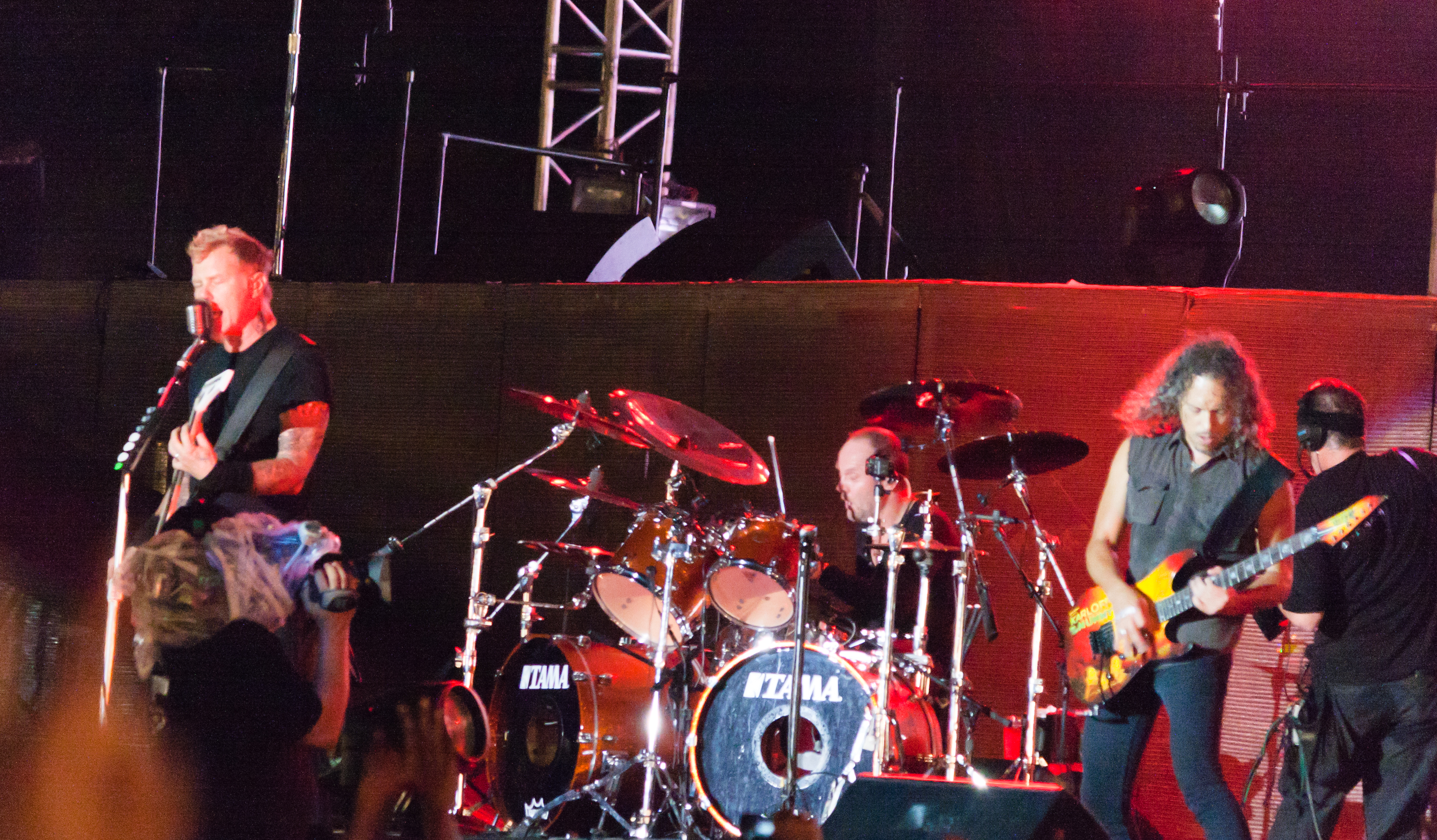
Metallica performing in Bangalore in 2011

Metallica was due to make its first appearance in India at the "India Rocks" concert, supporting the 2011 Indian Grand Prix. However, the concert was canceled when the venue was proven to be unsafe. Fans raided the stage during the event and the organizers were later arrested for fraud. Metallica made its Indian debut in Bangalore on October 30, 2011. On November 10, it was announced that Metallica would headline the main stage on Saturday June 9, 2012, at the Download Festival at Donington Park and that the band would play The Black Album in its entirety. Metallica celebrated its 30th anniversary by playing four shows at the Fillmore in San Francisco in December 2011. The shows were exclusive to Met Club members and tickets were charged at $6 each or $19.81 for all four nights. The shows consisted of songs from the band's career and featured guest appearances by artists who had either helped or had influenced Metallica. These shows were notable because Lloyd Grant, Dave Mustaine, Jason Newsted, Glenn Danzig, Ozzy Osbourne, Jerry Cantrell, Apocalyptica, members of Diamond Head, and King Diamond joined Metallica on stage for all appropriate songs. In December 2011, Metallica began releasing songs that were written for Death Magnetic but were not included on the album online. On December 13, 2011, the band released Beyond Magnetic, a digital EP release exclusively on iTunes. It was released on CD in January 2012.

On February 7, 2012, Metallica announced that it would start a new music festival called Orion Music + More, which took place on June 23 and 24, 2012, in Atlantic City. Metallica also confirmed that it would headline the festival on both days and would perform two of its most critically acclaimed albums in their entirety: The Black Album on one night, and Ride the Lightning on the other. In a July 2012 interview with Canadian radio station 99.3 The Fox, Ulrich said Metallica would not release its new album until at least early 2014.

In November 2012, Metallica left Warner Bros. Records and launched an independent record label, Blackened Recordings, which will produce the band's future releases. The band acquired the rights to all of its studio albums, which were all reissued through the new label. Blackened releases were licensed through Warner subsidiary Rhino Entertainment in North America and internationally through Universal Music. On September 20, 2012, Metallica announced via its official website that a new DVD containing footage of shows it performed in Quebec in 2009 would be released that December; fans would get the chance to vote for two setlists that would appear on the DVD. The film, titled Quebec Magnetic, was released in the U.S. on December 10, 2012.

=== 2013–2019: Metallica: Through the Never and Hardwired... to Self-Destruct ===
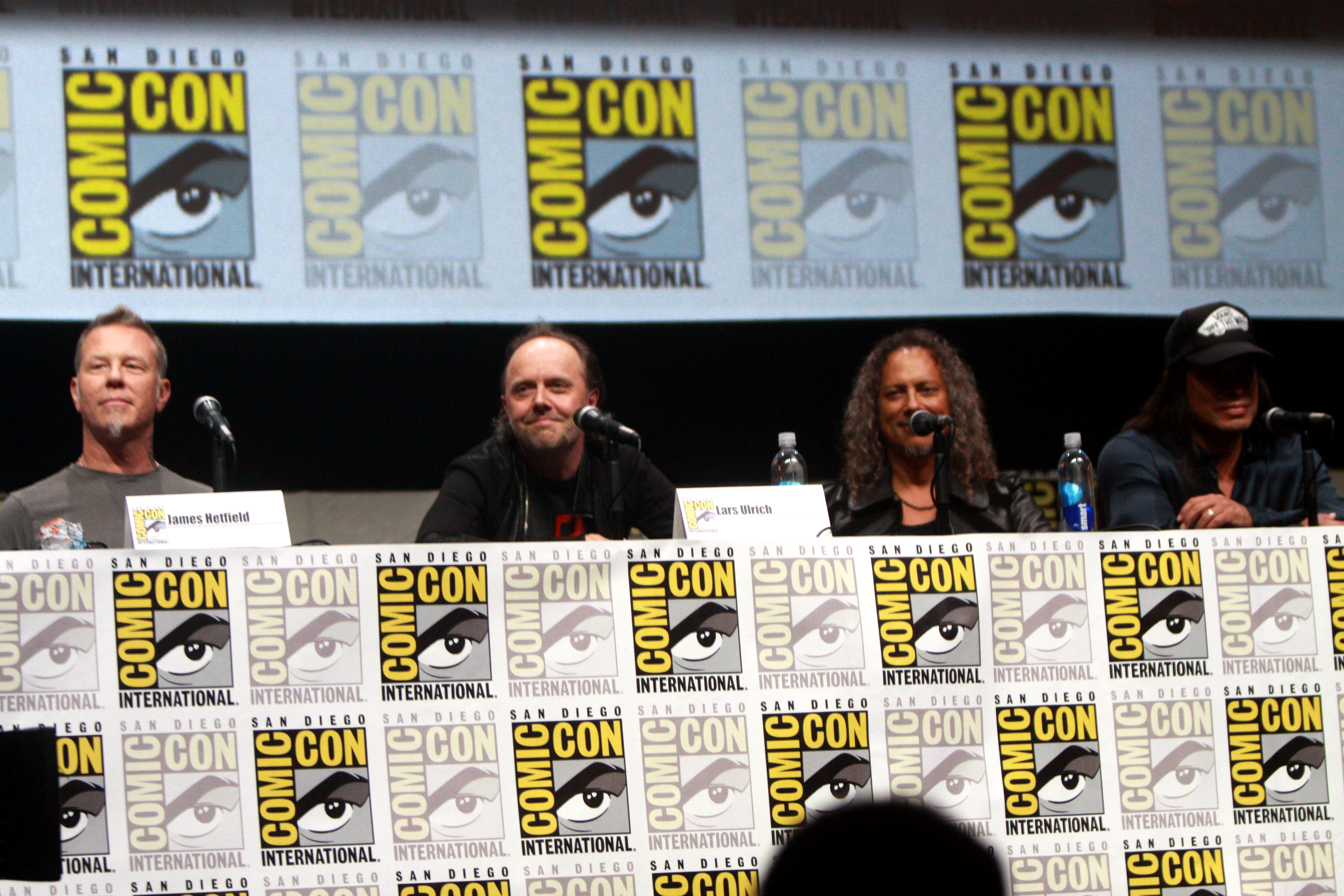
Metallica at San Diego Comic-Con in 2013

In an interview with Classic Rock on January 8, 2013, Ulrich said regarding the band's upcoming album, "What we're doing now certainly sounds like a continuation [of Death Magnetic]". He also said, "I love Rick [Rubin]. We all love Rick. We're in touch with Rick constantly. We'll see where it goes. It would stun me if the record came out in 2013." Also in 2013, the band starred in a 3D concert film titled Metallica: Through the Never, which was directed by Antal Nimród and was released in IMAX theaters on September 27.

In an interview dated July 22, 2013, Ulrich told Ultimate Guitar, "2014 will be all about making a new Metallica record"; he said the album will most likely be released during 2015. Kirk Hammett and Robert Trujillo later confirmed the band's intention to enter the studio. At the second Orion Music + More festival held in Detroit, the band played under the name "Dehaan"—a reference to actor Dane DeHaan, who starred in Metallica: Through the Never. The band performed its debut album Kill 'Em All in its entirety, celebrating the 30th anniversary of its release. On December 8, 2013, the band played a show called "Freeze 'Em All" in Antarctica, becoming the first band to play on all seven continents. The performance was filmed and released as a live album the same month.

At the 56th Annual Grammy Awards in January 2014, Metallica performed "One" with Chinese pianist Lang Lang. In March 2014, Metallica began a tour called "Metallica By Request", in which fans request songs for the band to perform. A new song, titled "Lords of Summer" was written for the concerts and released as a "first take" demo in June 2014. In June 2014, the band headlined the Glastonbury Festival in an attempt to attract new fans. Ulrich said, "We have one shot, you never know if you'll be invited back". In November 2014, Metallica performed at the closing ceremony of BlizzCon 2014.

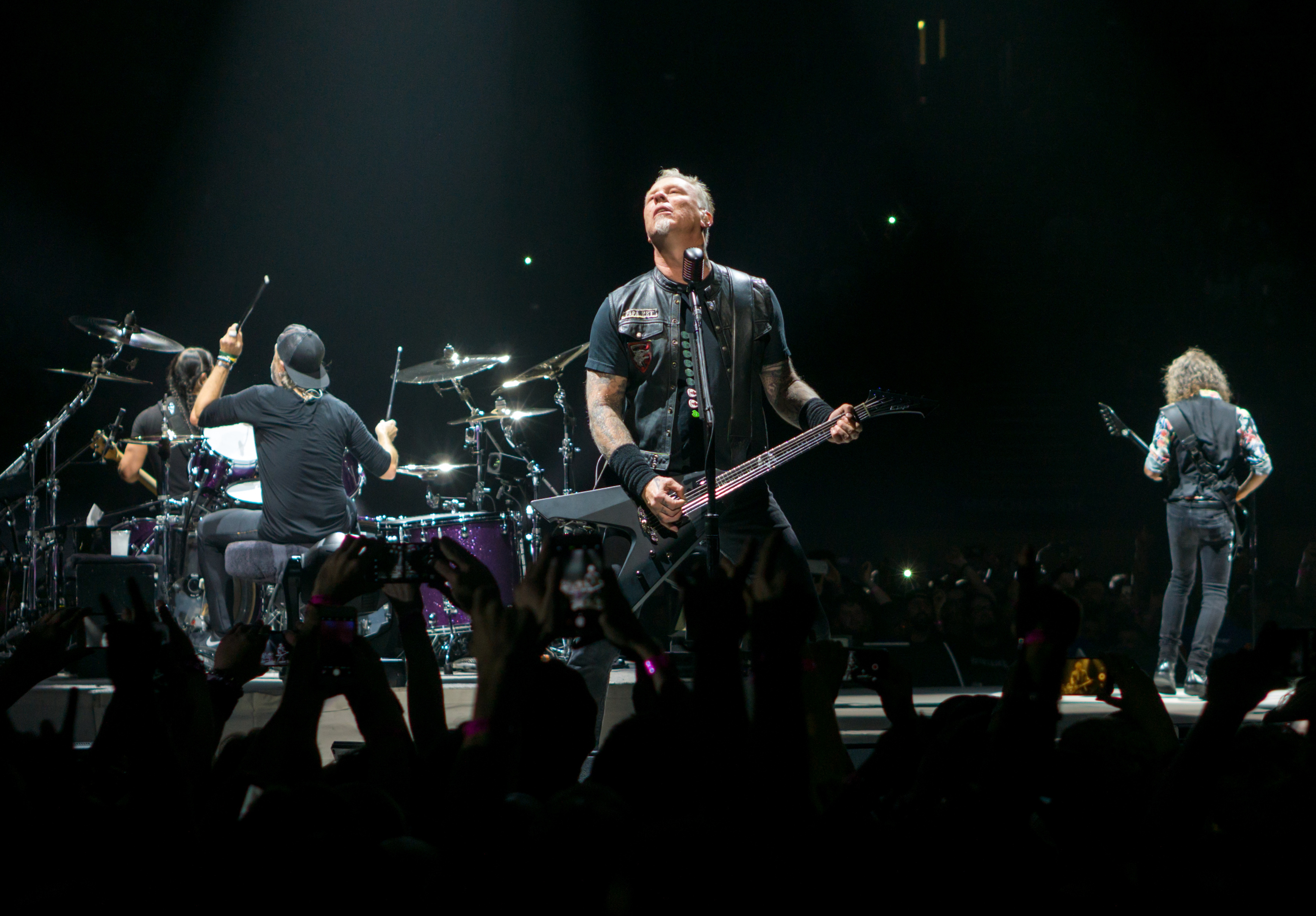
Metallica performing in London in 2017

In January 2015, Metallica announced a "Metallica Night" with the San Jose Sharks, which featured a Q&A session with the band and a charity auction benefiting the San Francisco Bay Chapter of the Sierra Club, but no performances. They were announced to headline Lollapalooza in March 2015, returning to perform there for the first time in 20 years. On May 2, 2015, Metallica performed their third annual Metallica Day at AT&T Park. Metallica were also announced to play at X Games for the first time at X Games Austin 2015 in Austin, Texas. On June 14, 2015, Hetfield and Hammett performed "The Star-Spangled Banner" live via electric guitars prior to game 5 of the NBA Finals between the Cleveland Cavaliers and Golden State Warriors at Oracle Arena in Oakland, California. In late October, the band unveiled a new website with an introduction from Ulrich containing footage from the studio of the band working on new material. On November 2, Metallica were announced to play "The Night Before" Super Bowl 50 at AT&T Park. Metallica announced they would be opening the U.S. Bank Stadium on August 20, 2016, with Avenged Sevenfold and Volbeat as support.

In April 2016, during the week leading up to Record Store Day, for which the band was its ambassador for 2016, Ulrich told Billboard that the band's expanded role within the music industry had played a part in the amount of time that it had taken to write and record the album. "The way we do things now is very different than the way we did things back in the days of Kill 'Em All and Ride the Lightning. Nowadays we like to do so many different things." Ulrich was also optimistic that production of the album had almost reached its completion. "Unless something radical happens it would be difficult for me to believe that it won't come out in 2016". On August 18, 2016, the band announced via their website that their tenth studio album, Hardwired... to Self-Destruct, would be released worldwide on November 18, 2016, via their independent label, Blackened Recordings. They also unveiled the track listing, album artwork, and released a music video for the album's first single, "Hardwired". The album was released as scheduled and debuted at number one on the Billboard 200.

Metallica announced they would be touring the US and Canada in summer of 2017 for the WorldWired Tour. The stadium tour also includes Avenged Sevenfold, Volbeat and Gojira as supporting acts. On August 7, 2017, Metallica was invited by the San Francisco Giants again for the fifth annual "Metallica Night" with Hammett and Hetfield performing the national anthem. In January 2018, the band announced that they would be reissuing The $5.98 E.P. – Garage Days Re-Revisited on April 13 for Record Store Day, and the sixth annual "Metallica Night" was also announced a few weeks later, this time in April, with all proceeds going to the All Within My Hands Foundation, which the band created in late 2017. In February 2018, the band announced a second set of North American tour dates, most of which for cities that they had not visited in up to thirty years.

=== 2019–2023: S&M2 and 72 Seasons ===
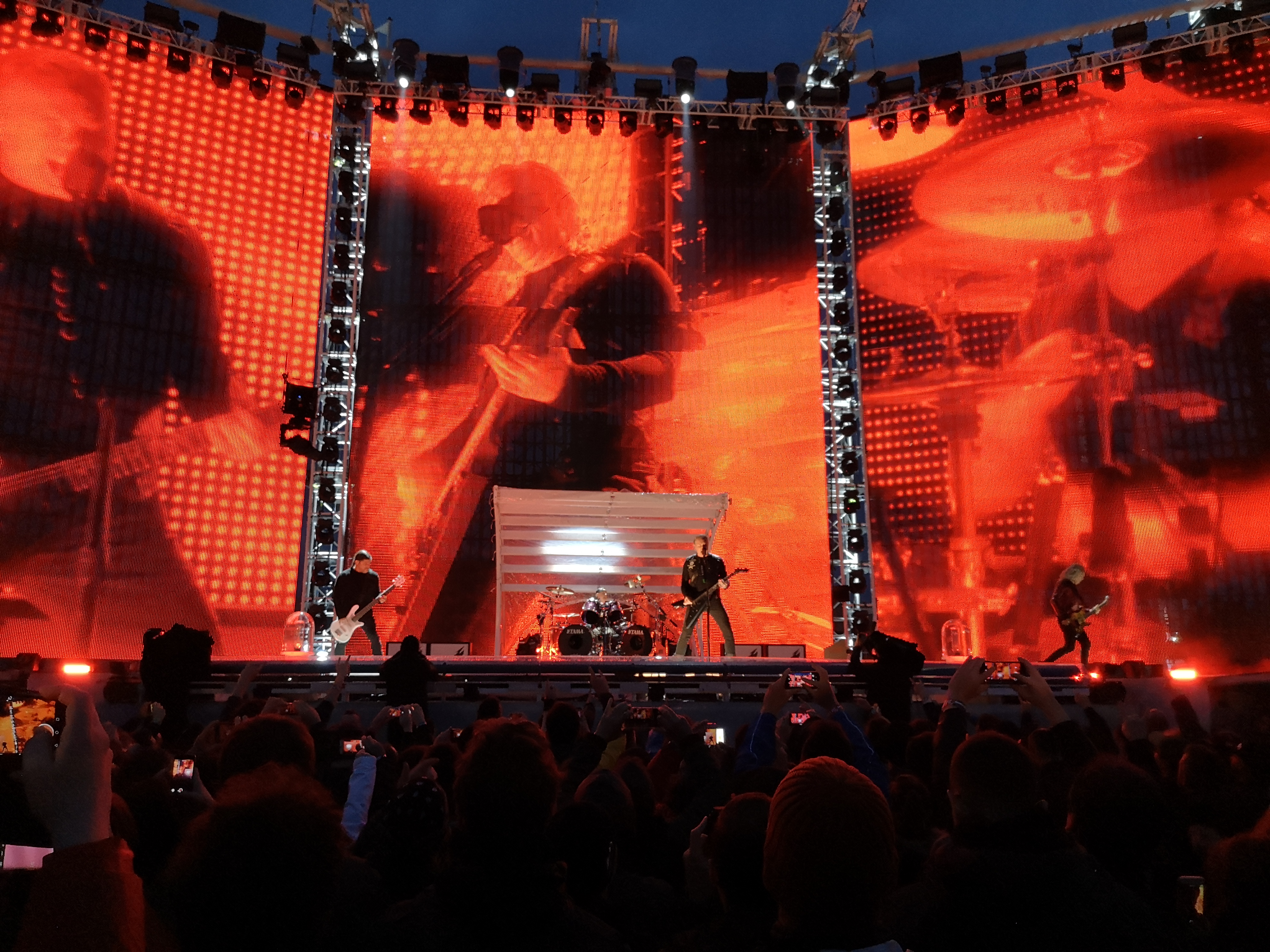
Metallica performing in Milan, 2019

In an interview with Australian magazine The Music's official podcast in March 2019, Trujillo said that Metallica had begun jamming on new material for its next studio album. "I'm excited about the next record because I believe it will also be a culmination of the two [previous] records and another journey. There's no shortage of original ideas, that's the beauty of being in this band." He estimated that the album would be released sooner than the previous two did, saying: "this time around I think we'll be able to jump on it a lot quicker and jump in the studio and start working." In an interview with Australian magazine Mixdown the following month, Hammett said that the band had tentative plans to enter the studio after the conclusion of its WorldWired Tour. He stated, "We're in our third year since Hardwired. Maybe we can get a bit more focus and go into the studio a bit sooner." After not contributing any writing to Hardwired... to Self-Destruct, Hammett said regarding his ideas for the new album, "I have a ton of material. I've over-compensated, so I'm ready to go anytime."

In March 2019, Metallica announced that its WorldWired Tour would continue into Australia and New Zealand in October with Slipknot in support. Later that month, the band announced that it would perform at the grand opening of San Francisco's new Chase Center with the San Francisco Symphony in September to celebrate the twenty-year anniversary of S&M. The commemorative shows, titled S&M2, were screened in more than 3,000 theaters worldwide on October 9; the event featured arrangements from the original S&M concerts as well as new arrangements for songs recorded since then and a cover of the Alexander Mosolov piece Iron Foundry, and were conducted by Edwin Outwater and San Francisco Symphony music director Michael Tilson Thomas. S&M2 went on to earn $5.5 million at the box office, making it the biggest global rock event cinema release of all time; a second screening was later announced for October 30 as a result. In August 2020, the band announced that they would release the S&M2 performances as an album, DVD and box set.

In July 2019, Metallica announced a set of South American tour dates for April 2020 with Greta Van Fleet in support. In September, ahead of that year's Global Citizen Festival, it was announced that Metallica would perform at the following year's festival in September 2020 alongside artists such as Billie Eilish, Miley Cyrus and Coldplay, in what would be the final event of Global Poverty Project's year-long Global Goal Live: The Possible Dream campaign. The following day, on September 27, Metallica announced that Hetfield had re-entered a rehabilitation program and that its Australia/New Zealand tour would be postponed. In a statement by Ulrich, Hammett and Trujillo, the band spoke of the devastation of the news, saying that Hetfield "[had] been struggling with addiction on and off for many years" and that all tickets would be fully refunded. Ulrich later added that Hetfield was "in the process of healing himself", and that the band hoped to return to Australia and New Zealand in 2020. The band's other commitments, including a benefit concert in March 2020, were still expected to continue as planned; a further five US festival appearances were announced in October. These shows were later postponed or cancelled due to the COVID-19 pandemic and to support Hetfield's recovery.

In March 2020, the band began a series on YouTube and Facebook called #MetallicaMondays, where they streamed full archived shows every Monday to relieve boredom while staying home and social distancing amid the pandemic. In May 2020, while in quarantine, Metallica performed a virtual acoustic version of "Blackened", titled "Blackened 2020", which was later made available for download. In an interview with Marc Benioff in April 2020, Ulrich stated that Metallica could work on its next studio album while in quarantine. Trujillo told The Vinyl Guide in June that the band was "excited about cultivating new ideas" for its new album. "We communicate every week, which is really great, so we have our connection intact. And what we've started doing is basically just really concentrating on our home studios and being creative from our homes and navigating through ideas and building on new ideas. And that's where we're at right now". He also said that the band was working towards eventually entering a studio to record the album. On August 10, 2020, Metallica played a show at Gundlach-Bundschu Winery in Sonoma, California, which was only attended by a few crew members, and it was recorded and played for drive-in movies across the U.S. and Canada on August 29.

In May 2021, the band announced that they would do one more #MetallicaMondays on May 24 to benefit their All Within My Hands Foundation. The concert dates to September 6, 2018, in Lincoln, Nebraska. On Labor Day, September 6, 2021, the band's All Within My Hands Foundation raised $377,450. Metallica teamed up with workwear brand Carhartt on the initiative, with the clothing brand donating all of their sales proceeds on the holiday to the band's Metallica Scholars initiative, which provides opportunities to people interested in pursuing essential workforce jobs.

On November 28, 2022, the band released the single "Lux Æterna". On January 19, 2023, Metallica released the second single titled "Screaming Suicide". On March 1, 2023, Metallica released the third single titled "If Darkness Had a Son". On March 30, 2023, Metallica released a music video for the album's title track, "72 Seasons". The band released their eleventh studio album 72 Seasons on April 14, 2023. Metallica promoted the album with a four-and-a-half-year-long tour, titled the M72 World Tour, which began on April 27, 2023 in Amsterdam, and is set to conclude on June 19, 2027 in Salt Lake City.

=== 2023–present: Future plans ===
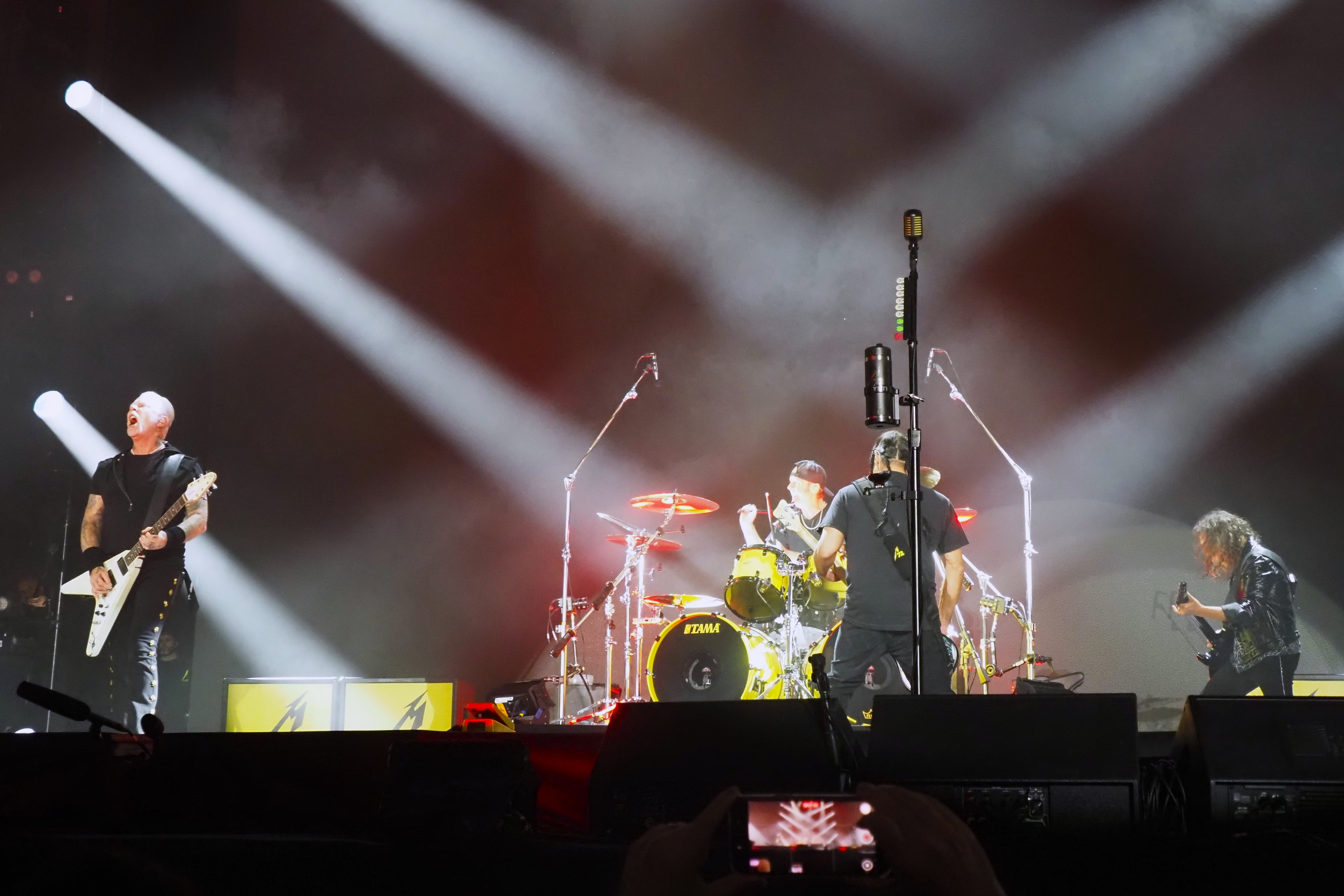
Metallica performing in Melbourne in 2025

In an interview on Loudwire Nights radio program in April 2023, Ulrich stated that "there [were] some ideas [Metallica] could start with" for the follow-up to 72 Seasons, adding, "I'm looking forward to going live and being in sharing mode for the next couple of years. The beauty of being with these guys, I kind of joke, James writes more riffs when he's tuning his guitar than most people do in a lifetime. That's the beauty of being in band with these guys and I'm eternally grateful. I'm dumbfounded by it." When asked about "leftovers" that could be used for the next Metallica album, Ulrich said, "There's always a few riffs in the riff tank." In May 2024, Hetfield confirmed that he has been "writing lots of music, playing guitar pretty much every day".

In a March 2025 interview with Rolling Stone, Hammett confirmed that he has been working on ideas for the next Metallica album: "I have 767 new ones for the next album. It is such a nightmare going through this stuff, too. And I'm the one responsible for all of it and I can't do it...I don't foresee us starting the next album for at least another year because we're still finishing the tour."

== Musical style and lyrical themes ==
"Damage Inc." (1986)
"Damage Inc." (Master of Puppets), demonstrating Metallica's fast tempo, and aggressive musicianship featured in early releases

"Sad but True" (1991)
"Sad but True" (Metallica); Robert Palmer of Rolling Stone believed the band abandoned fast tempos to expand its music and expressive range in 1991

"Purify" (2003)
"Purify" (St. Anger), demonstrating Metallica's new musical approach with no guitar solos, a "raw, unpolished" sound, and Ulrich's snare drum

Metallica played thrash and speed metal on its first four albums before changing to a more traditional heavy metal style on its self-titled 1991 album. The band then moved towards a hard rock sound on Load (1996) and Reload (1997). 2008's Death Magnetic saw them returning to a more thrash-influenced sound.

The band was influenced by early heavy metal and hard rock bands and artists such as Black Sabbath, Pink Floyd, Deep Purple, Kiss, Led Zeppelin, Queen, Ted Nugent, AC/DC, Rush, Aerosmith, and Judas Priest, new wave of British heavy metal bands Raven, Venom, Motörhead, Saxon, Diamond Head, Blitzkrieg, and Iron Maiden and European bands Scorpions, Accept, and Mercyful Fate. They were also influenced by punk rock bands such as the Ramones, the Sex Pistols, and Misfits, post-punk band Killing Joke and hardcore punk bands Discharge, GBH, and Suicidal Tendencies.

Lars Ulrich has cited Iron Maiden as probably the biggest influence on Metallica's career. The band's early releases contained fast tempos, harmonized leads, and nine-minute instrumental tracks. Steve Huey of AllMusic said Ride the Lightning featured "extended, progressive epics; tight, concise groove-rockers". He also said Metallica expanded its compositional technique and range of expression to take on a more aggressive approach in following releases, and lyrics dealt with personal and socially conscious issues. Religious and military leaders, rage, insanity, monsters, and drugs—among other themes—were explored on Master of Puppets.

In 1991, Huey said Metallica with new producer Bob Rock simplified and streamlined its music for a more commercial approach to appeal to mainstream audiences. Robert Palmer of Rolling Stone said the band abandoned its aggressive, fast tempos to expand its music and expressive range. The change in direction proved commercially successful; Metallica was the band's first album to peak at number one on the Billboard 200. Metallica noticed changes to the rock scene created by the grunge movement of the early-1990s. In Load—an album that has been described as having "an almost alternative rock" approach—the band changed musical direction again and focused on non-metal influences.

Metallica's new lyrical approach moved away from drugs and monsters, and focused on anger, loss, and retribution. Some fans and critics were not pleased with this change, which included haircuts, the cover art of Load, a new main logo, and headlining the Lollapalooza festival of 1996. David Fricke of Rolling Stone described the move as "goodbye to the moldy stricture and dead-end Puritanism of no-frills thrash", and called Load the heaviest record of 1996. With the release of ReLoad in 1997, the band displayed blues and early hard rock influences, incorporating more rhythm and harmony in song structures.

St. Anger marked another large change in the band's sound. Guitar solos were excluded from the album, leaving a "raw and unpolished sound". The band used drop C tuning; Ulrich's snare drum received particular criticism. New York Magazine's Ethan Brown said it "reverberates with a thwong". The album's lyrics deal with Hetfield's drug rehabilitation and include references to the devil, anti-drug themes, claustrophobia, impending doom, and religious hypocrisy. At the advice of producer Rick Rubin, for its ninth studio album Death Magnetic, the band returned to standard tuning and guitar solos. As a return to Metallica's thrash roots, Death Magnetic was a riff-oriented album featuring intense guitar solos and subtle lyrics about suicide and redemption.

== All Within My Hands Foundation ==
In February 2017, Metallica launched All Within My Hands Foundation, "dedicated to creating sustainable communities by supporting workforce education, the fight against hunger, and other critical local services". For example, the group works with various selected charities to organize volunteer projects at food banks. It also works with workforce training institutions on its Metallica Scholars grant program to help chosen students learn new trade skills. The Foundation has also donated and raised funds for World Central Kitchen's relief efforts during the Russo-Ukrainian war and granted $200,000 for relief efforts after the destructive 2023 Hawaii wildfires. The band has also performed fundraising concerts for the Foundation. The Foundation takes its name from the song All Within My Hands from the St. Anger album.

== Legacy and influence ==
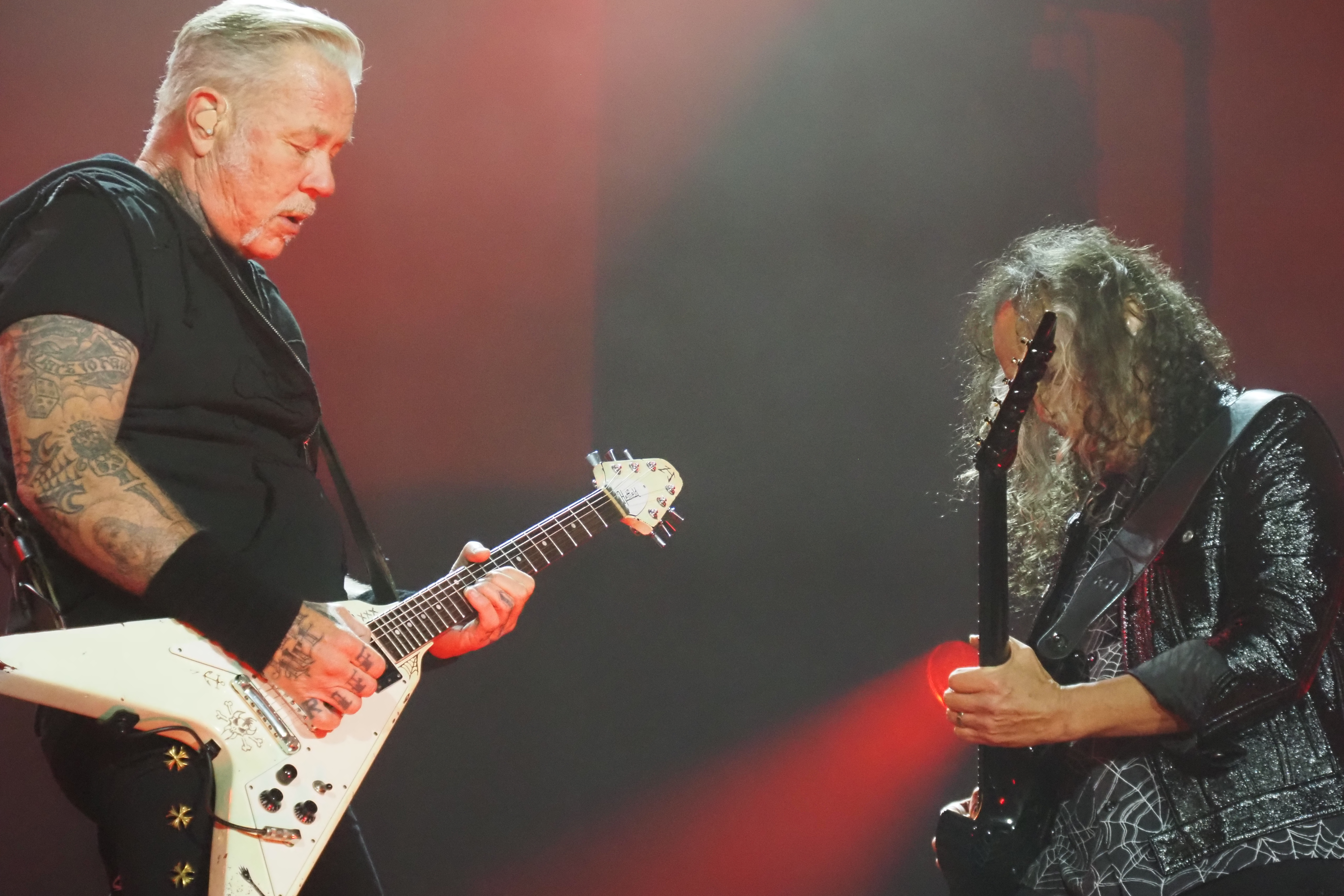
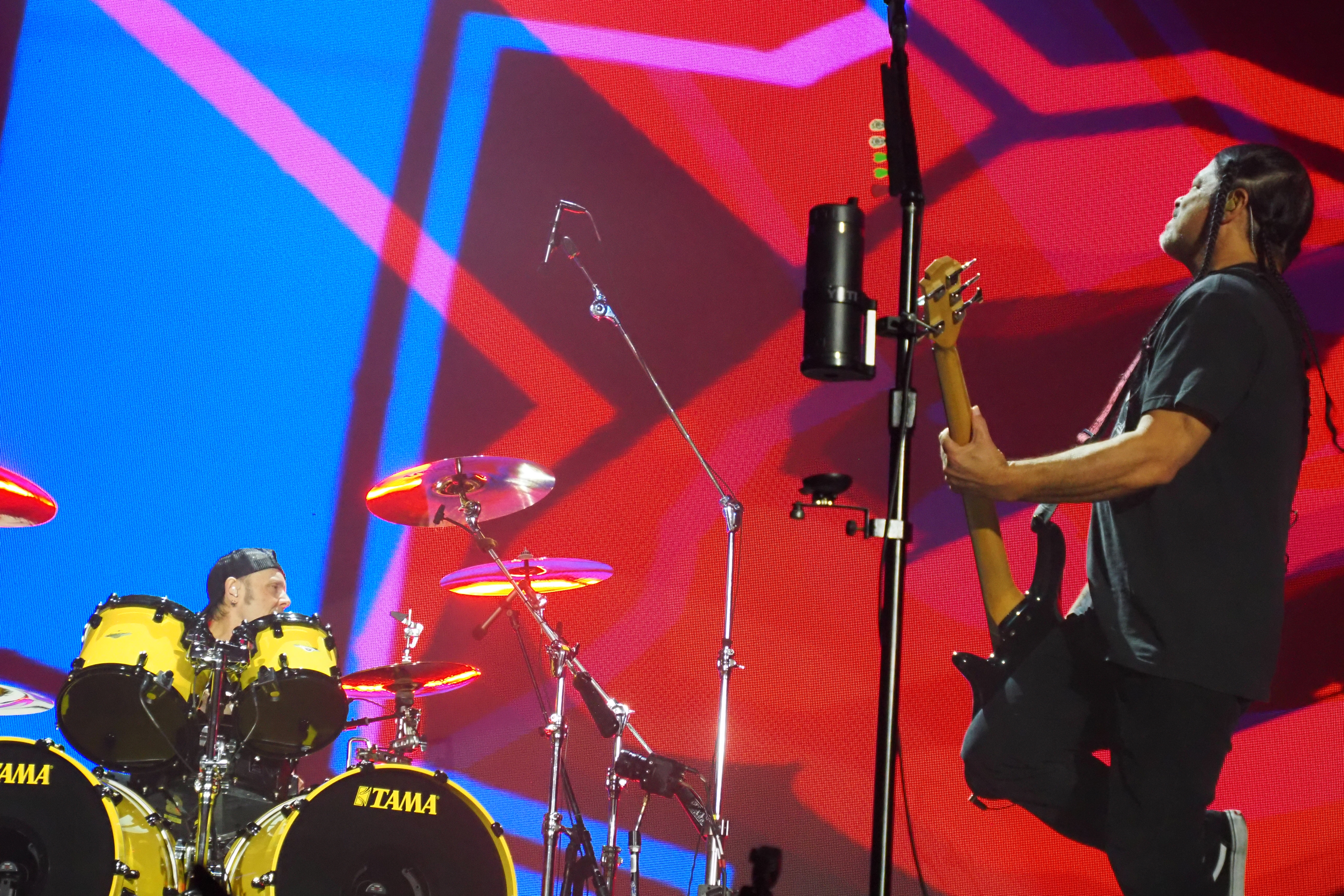
Metallica performing in Melbourne in 2025

Metallica has become one of the most influential heavy metal bands of all time and is credited as one of the "big four" of thrash metal, along with Slayer, Anthrax, and Megadeth. The band has sold more than 125 million records worldwide, including an RIAA-certified 71 million and Nielsen SoundScan-reported 53 million in the US, making Metallica one of the most commercially successful bands of all time. The writers of The Rolling Stone Encyclopedia of Rock & Roll said Metallica gave heavy metal "a much-needed charge". Stephen Thomas Erlewine and Greg Prato of Allmusic said Metallica "expanded the limits of thrash, using speed and volume not for their own sake, but to enhance their intricately structured compositions", and called the band "easily the best, most influential heavy metal band of the '80s, responsible for bringing the music back to Earth".

Jonathan Davis of Korn said he respects Metallica as his favorite band; he said, "I love that they've done things their own way and they've persevered over the years and they're still relevant to this day. I think they're one of the greatest bands ever." Godsmack drummer Shannon Larkin said Metallica has been the biggest influence on the band, stating, "they really changed my life when I was 16 years old—I'd never heard anything that heavy". Chuck Billy of Testament has also cited Metallica as an influence on the band, as well as Hetfield as "an inspiration with clever lyrics"; he added, "When I first started hearing Metallica it was something new to me the way his cadence of vocal styles sang to the music." Vocalist and guitarist Robb Flynn of Machine Head said that when creating the band's 2007 album, The Blackening, "What we mean is an album that has the power, influence and epic grandeur of that album Master of Puppets—and the staying power—a timeless record like that". Gojira guitarist Christian Andreu said it was while listening to Ride the Lightning that he started making music; saying "we find on the album 'Fade to Black', 'For Whom the Bell Tolls', emblematic pieces". Trivium guitarists Corey Beaulieu and Matt Heafy said that when they heard Metallica they wanted to start playing guitar. M. Shadows of Avenged Sevenfold said touring with Metallica was the band's career highlight, and said, "Selling tons of records and playing huge shows will never compare to meeting your idols Metallica". God Forbid guitarists Doc and Dallas Coyle were inspired by Metallica as they grew up, and the band's bassist John Outcalt admires Burton as a "rocker". Ill Niño drummer Dave Chavarri said he finds early Metallica releases are "heavy, raw, rebellious. It said, 'fuck you'", and Adema drummer Kris Kohls said the band is influenced by Metallica.

On April 4, 2009, Metallica were inducted into the Rock and Roll Hall of Fame. They entered the Rock and Roll Hall of Fame the second year they were eligible and first year they were nominated. Metallica's induction into the Hall included its current lineup, James Hetfield, Kirk Hammett, Robert Trujillo, and Lars Ulrich, and former members Jason Newsted and Cliff Burton.

MTV ranked Metallica the third "Greatest Heavy Metal Band in History". Metallica was ranked 42nd on VH1's "100 Greatest Artists of All Time", was listed fifth on VH1's "100 Greatest Artists of Hard Rock", and the band was number one on VH1's "20 Greatest Metal Bands" list. Rolling Stone placed the band 61st on its list of "The 100 Greatest Artists of All Time"; its albums Master of Puppets and Metallica were ranked at numbers 167 and 252 respectively on the magazine's list of The 500 Greatest Albums of All Time. Master of Puppets was named in Q Magazine's "50 Heaviest Albums of All Time", and was ranked number one on IGN's "Top 25 Metal Albums", and number one on Metal-rules.com's "Top 100 Heavy Metal Albums" list. "Enter Sandman" was ranked number 399 on Rolling Stone's "500 Greatest Songs of All Time".

Kerrang! released a tribute album titled Master of Puppets: Remastered with the April 8, 2006, edition of the magazine to celebrate the 20th anniversary of Master of Puppets. The album featured cover versions of Metallica songs by Machine Head, Bullet for My Valentine, Chimaira, Mastodon, Mendeed, and Trivium—all of which are influenced by Metallica. At least 15 Metallica tribute albums have been released. On September 10, 2006, Metallica guest starred on The Simpsons' eighteenth-season premiere, "The Mook, the Chef, the Wife and Her Homer". Hammett's and Hetfield's voices were used in three episodes of the animated television series Metalocalypse.

They were cited as an influence by many heavy metal bands including Sepultura, Testament, Slipknot, Machine Head, Bullet for My Valentine, Trivium, Avenged Sevenfold, Killswitch Engage, System of a Down, Lamb of God, Gojira, As I Lay Dying, Fear Factory, Korn, and Taproot.

In 1996, Finnish cello metal band Apocalyptica released a tribute album titled Plays Metallica by Four Cellos, which features eight Metallica songs played on cellos. A parody band named Beatallica plays music using a combination of the Beatles and Metallica songs. Beatallica faced legal troubles when Sony, which owns the Beatles' catalog, issued a cease and desist order, claiming "substantial and irreparable injury" and ordering the group to pay damages. Ulrich, a fan of Beatallica, asked Metallica's lawyer Peter Paterno to help settle the case.

On March 7, 1999, Metallica was inducted into the San Francisco Walk of Fame. The mayor of San Francisco, Willie Brown, proclaimed the day "Official Metallica Day". The band was awarded the MTV Icon award in 2003, and a concert paying tribute to the band with artists performing its songs was held. Performances included Sum 41 and a medley of "For Whom the Bell Tolls", "Enter Sandman", and "Master of Puppets". Staind covered "Nothing Else Matters", Avril Lavigne played "Fuel", hip-hop artist Snoop Dogg performed "Sad but True", Korn played "One", and Limp Bizkit performed "Welcome Home (Sanitarium)".

The Guitar Hero video game series included several of Metallica's songs. "One" was used in Guitar Hero III. The album Death Magnetic was later released as purchasable, downloadable content for the game. "Trapped Under Ice" was featured in the sequel, Guitar Hero World Tour. In 2009, Metallica collaborated with the game's developers to make Guitar Hero: Metallica, which included a number of Metallica's songs. Harmonix' video game series Rock Band included "Enter Sandman" and "Battery"; "Ride the Lightning", "Blackened", and "...And Justice for All" were released as downloadable tracks. In 2013, due to expiring content licenses, "Ride the Lightning", "Blackened", and "...And Justice for All" are no longer available for download. Fortnite Festival, a 2023 rhythm game developed by Harmonix as part of Fortnite, held a Metallica-centric season from June to August 2024 which included "One", "Lux Æterna", and "Master of Puppets". Metallica also performed virtually in Fortnite in "Metallica: Fuel. Fire. Fury.", with cosmetics based on Hetfield, Ulrich, Hammett and Trujillo being added to the game.

In October 2020, Miley Cyrus announced that she was planning on recording a Metallica covers album and on January 7, 2021, she announced that she has recorded a cover version of "Nothing Else Matters" that would feature Elton John on piano, drummer Chad Smith from Red Hot Chili Peppers and cellist Yo-Yo Ma. This version was produced by Andrew Watt, and was released as a promotional single for the tribute album The Metallica Blacklist.

In late 2024, Sky News ran an article on Gaza's first rock group, Osprey V. The group's guitarist, Raji El-Jaru said that the group was influenced by Metallica and Linkin Park.

== Feuds ==
=== Dave Mustaine and Megadeth ===
Former lead guitarist and current Megadeth frontman Dave Mustaine has been involved in a historic feud with Metallica. During his time as a founding member during the first two years of the band, Mustaine's tenure was marred by his alcoholism and even a physical altercation with James Hetfield. Mustaine continued to make numerous inflammatory statements against his former band in the press due to buried tension primarily stemming from his firing in 1983 among other issues such as existing songwriting credits across Metallica's first three albums.

By the late 1980s, it was believed that the feud had largely subsided; later confirmed after Megadeth were hired to open for Metallica on numerous European dates in 1993. Despite this, Mustaine expressed his anger at Metallica during his appearance in the band's documentary Metallica: Some Kind of Monster, in a scene he later disapproved of as he felt he was mischaracterized, and that it did not represent the full extent of what happened during the meeting.

By 2010, the two bands found themselves on friendlier terms when they took part in the lauded "Big 4 Tour", alongside Slayer and Anthrax. That same year, Mustaine took part in Metallica's exclusive 30th anniversary show in San Francisco which invited other former members: Ron McGovney, Lloyd Grant, and Jason Newsted. In 2022, tensions reignited between the band and Mustaine following discussions over a remastered release of the No Life 'Til Leather demo in which Hetfield and Ulrich considered involving Mustaine. However, the relationship quickly began to deteriorate once again after a dispute with Ulrich insisting on crediting himself on each of the tracks, much to Mustaine's anger, resulting in the cancellation of the project entirely and reigniting hostility with his former bandmates.

=== Mötley Crüe ===
Often clashing during the early 1980s, both bands were fighting for dominance in the Los Angeles rock scene during Metallica's early years prior to their relocation to the Bay Area. Both James Hetfield and Lars Ulrich expressed their hatred of the hair metal scene in Los Angeles during the time and frequently attacked multiple up-and-coming local bands in multiple interviews, including Mötley Crüe, who later became labelmates with Metallica at Elektra Records. Ulrich and Mötley Crüe's bassist Nikki Sixx had allegedly been involved in a spat prior to a show at the Troubadour in Hollywood in 1982. Though despite their public disdain for glam metal, Metallica were impressed by the production and commercial success of Dr. Feelgood in 1989, later hiring the album's producer Bob Rock to produce their self-titled fifth album in 1991.

Several years later, Sixx and Ulrich reignited the feud after Ulrich accused Mötley Crüe of performing to a backing track at the 1997 American Music Awards. Sixx responded via an online forum in which he insulted numerous band members and also attacked Metallica's then-recent album Load. Despite this, Sixx praised Metallica's then-latest album St. Anger during a 2003 interview, contrary to the negative attention it received upon release.

In 2006, both Mötley Crüe drummer Tommy Lee, and former bassist Jason Newsted took part in a reality show titled Rock Star: Supernova as they would both participate in creating a supergroup while the show's premise revolved around finding a frontman via contest. During a 2011 meet-and-greet in Mexico City, Hetfield was approached by a fan attacking Mötley Crüe due to their public image and frequent appearances in tabloids. Hetfield refused to directly respond to the fan's comments towards Mötley Crüe but laughed in his insults toward the band.

In 2015, drummer Lee reignited the feud when he tweeted a picture of Ulrich with the words "Straight Outta Tempo" superimposed over his face. Following the post by Lee, Mötley Crüe singer Vince Neil had stated online that he was unaware of the feud with Metallica; however, during a later interview with an Oregon radio show, Neil was again asked about the band's current relationship with Metallica and hung up on the show's host. Things were alleged to have calmed down by 2017, when Hetfield appeared on Sixx's radio show Sixx Sense. During an interview in 2021, Sixx applauded Metallica's longevity and praised several of their releases during an interview.

=== Jason Newsted ===
Following his hiring in 1986, former bassist Jason Newsted had regularly experienced incidents of hazing and a perceived lack of acceptance from his bandmates despite his strong efforts in a majority of the band's live performances. Many fans and outlets cite the band's fourth album's unusual mixing to drown the bass tracks as a possible effort by Hetfield and Ulrich to minimize Newsted's involvement. This sentiment was further exacerbated by the fact that Newsted was only given songwriting credits on three songs during his 14-year span in the band which also saw him perform on four studio albums.

Tensions between Hetfield and Newsted reached a breaking point in 2000 after Hetfield repeatedly blocked Newsted's request to venture into his side project Echobrain. Discussions broke down and Newsted abruptly left the band in January 2001 prior to the recording of St. Anger. Despite Newsted's animosity surrounding his decision, he was later inducted into the hall of fame as a member of the band in 2009 and also appeared at the band's 30th anniversary show in San Francisco in 2011. In August 2021, to celebrate the 30th anniversary of the release of the band's self-titled album, Newsted was given a box set of the reissue to open for an unboxing video, which was uploaded to the band's YouTube channel.

== Band members ==
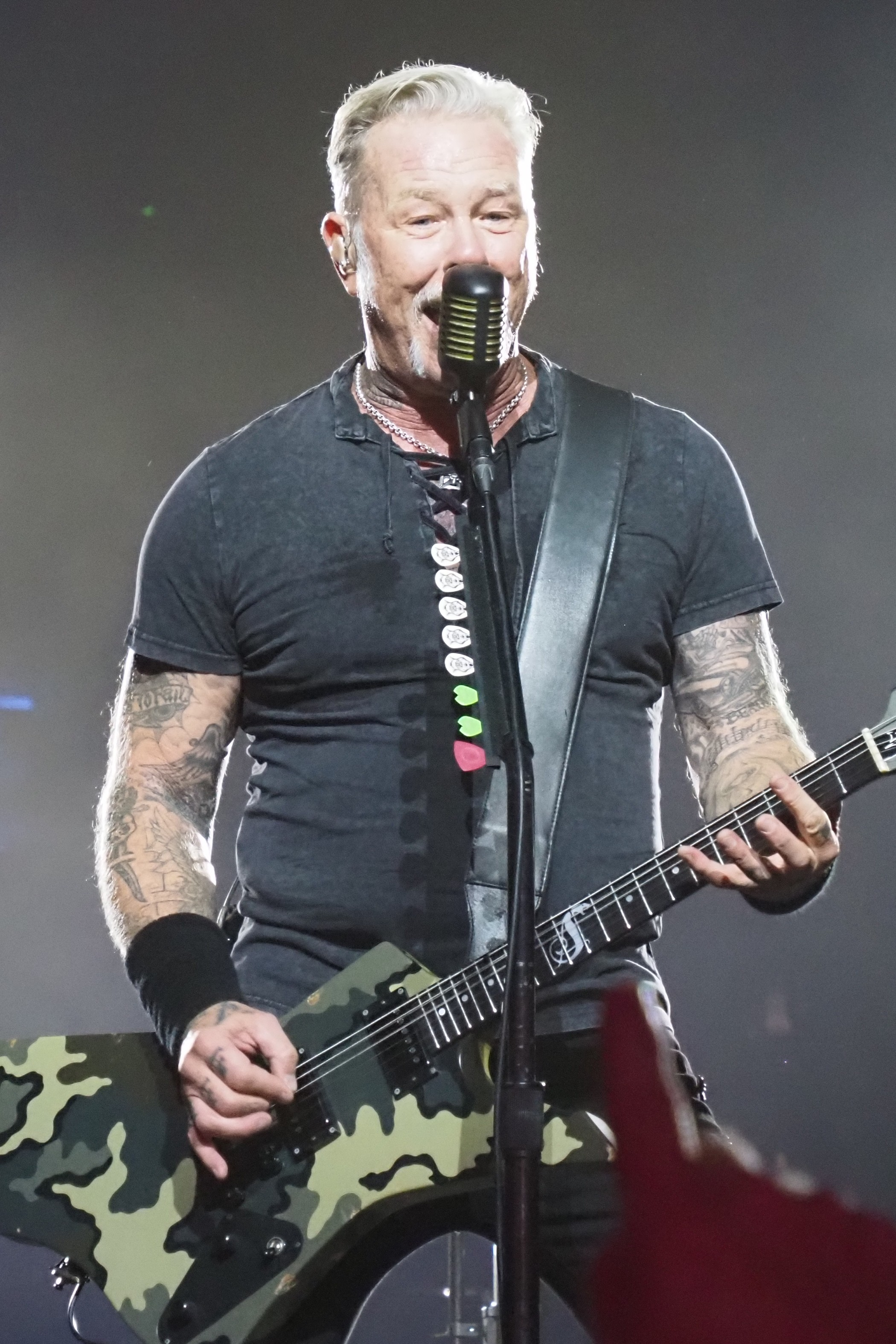
James Hetfield

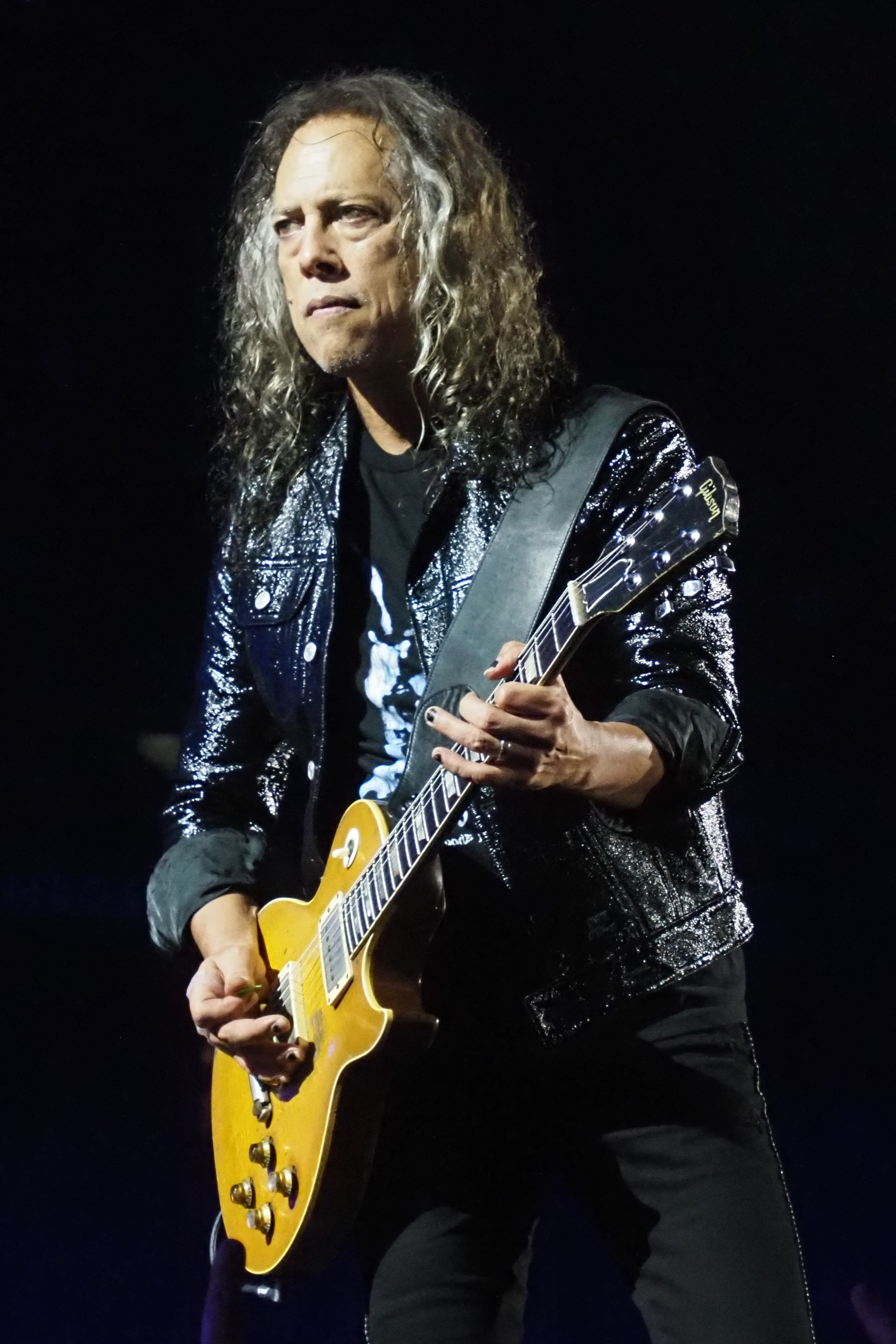
Kirk Hammett

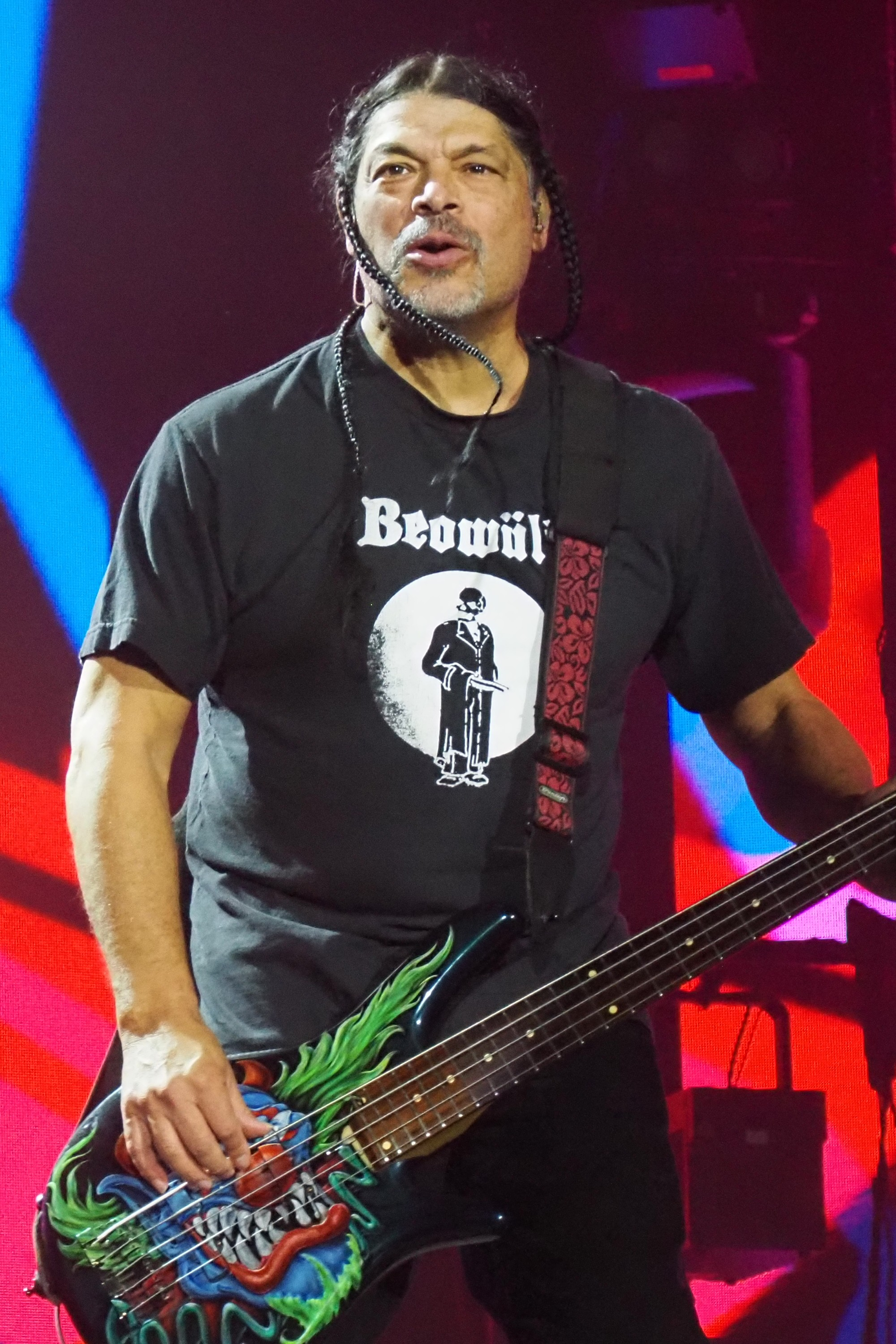
Robert Trujillo

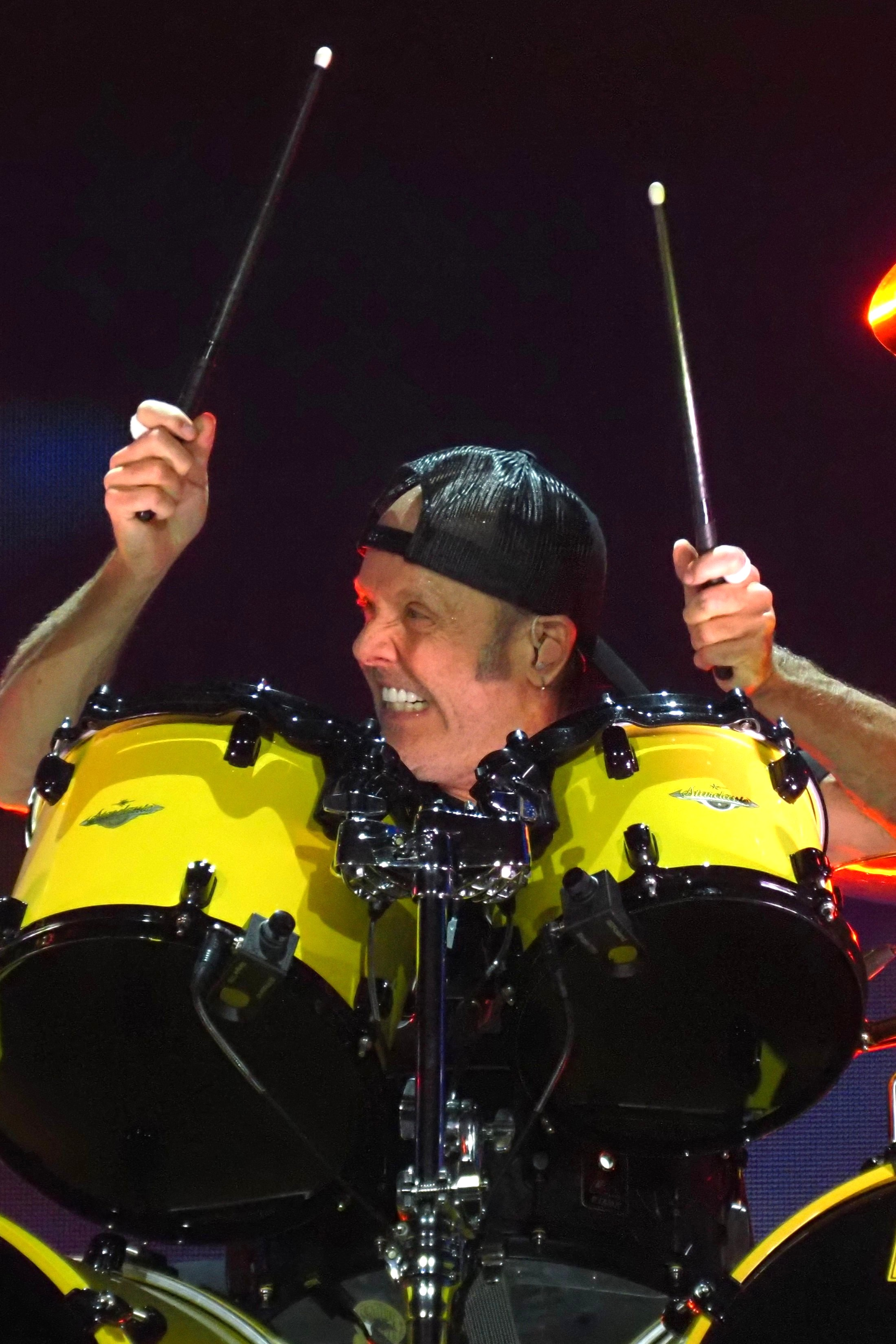
Lars Ulrich

Current

- James Hetfield – lead vocals, rhythm guitar (1981–present)
- Kirk Hammett – lead guitar, backing vocals (1983–present)
- Robert Trujillo – bass, backing vocals (2003–present)
- Lars Ulrich – drums (1981–present)

Session/touring musicians

- Bob Rock – bass, backing vocals (2001–2003)

Former

- Dave Mustaine – lead guitar (1981–1983)
- Ron McGovney – bass (1981–1982)
- Cliff Burton – bass, backing vocals (1982–1986; died 1986)
- Jason Newsted – bass, backing vocals (1986–2001)

== Discography ==
Studio albums

- Kill 'Em All (1983)
- Ride the Lightning (1984)
- Master of Puppets (1986)
- ...And Justice for All (1988)
- Metallica (1991)
- Load (1996)
- Reload (1997)
- St. Anger (2003)
- Death Magnetic (2008)
- Hardwired... to Self-Destruct (2016)
- 72 Seasons (2023)

== Awards and nominations ==
Grammy Awards

- 1990: Best Metal Performance – "One"
- 1991: Best Metal Performance – "Stone Cold Crazy"
- 1992: Best Metal Performance – Metallica
- 1999: Best Metal Performance – "Better than You"
- 2000: Best Hard Rock Performance – "Whiskey in the Jar"
- 2001: Best Rock Instrumental Performance – "The Call of Ktulu" (live; with Michael Kamen and the San Francisco Symphony)
- 2004: Best Metal Performance – "St. Anger"
- 2009: Best Metal Performance – "My Apocalypse"
- 2009: Best Recording Package – Death Magnetic
- 2024: Best Metal Performance – "72 Seasons"

== See also ==
- List of artists who reached number one on the U.S. Mainstream Rock chart
- List of bands from the San Francisco Bay Area
- List of best-selling music artists
- List of heavy metal bands
- List of highest-grossing live music artists
- List of people from California
- List of Rock and Roll Hall of Fame inductees
- List of thrash metal bands
