= List of songs recorded by Metallica =

List of songs by Metallica

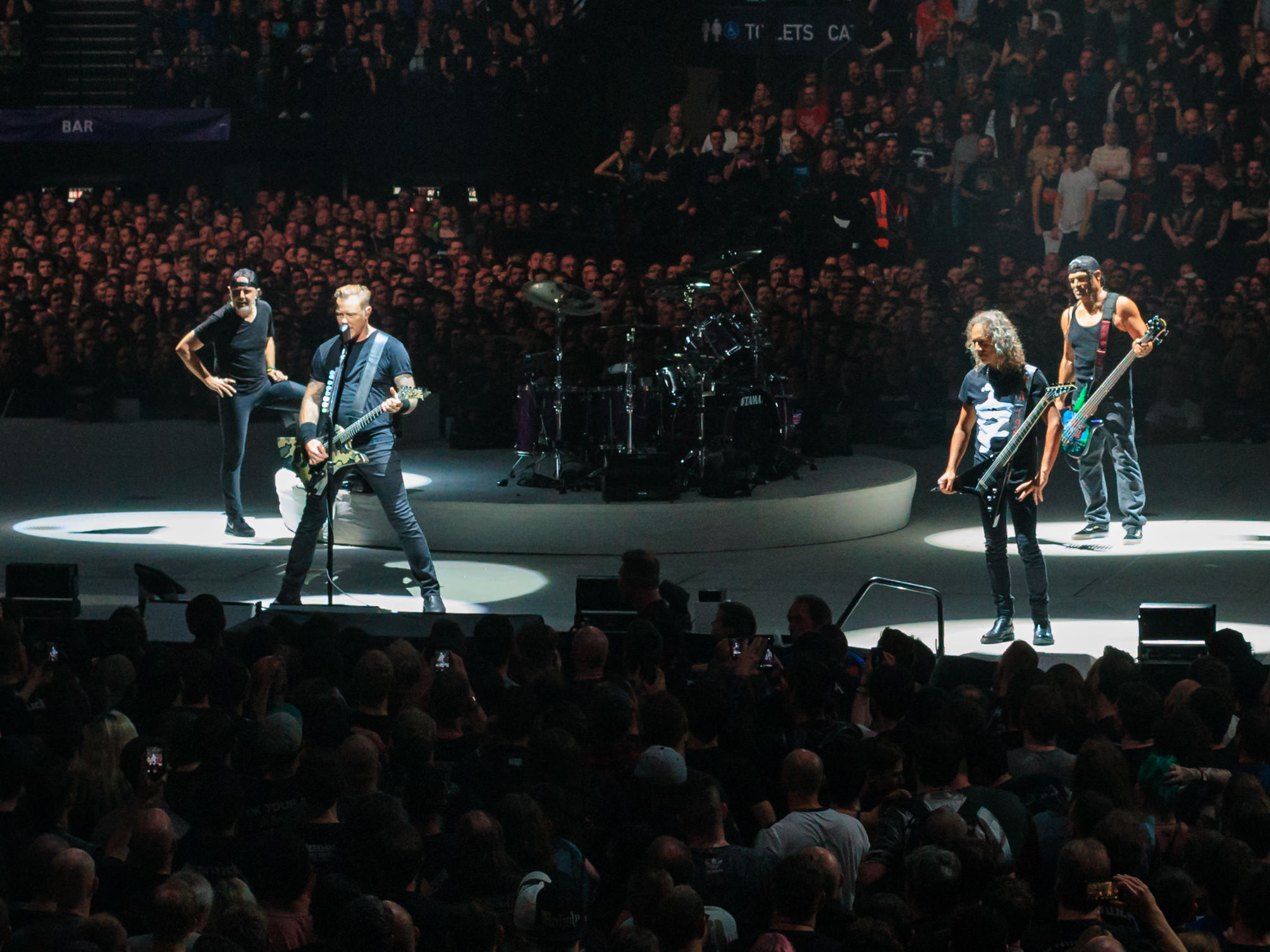
Metallica performing live in 2017. From left to right: Lars Ulrich, James Hetfield, Kirk Hammett and Robert Trujillo.

Metallica is an American heavy metal band formed in Los Angeles, California, in 1981. The band released its debut album Kill 'Em All in 1983, which credited songwriting between frontman James Hetfield, drummer Lars Ulrich and guitarist Dave Mustaine, who had left before the album was recorded (bassist Cliff Burton was credited for the bass solo "(Anesthesia) – Pulling Teeth"). On the 1984 follow-up Ride the Lightning, Burton received more songwriting credits and Mustaine's replacement Kirk Hammett was also co-credited on four songs. Master of Puppets, released in 1986, was the last album to feature Burton, who died in a bus accident later that year.

After bringing in Jason Newsted to replace Burton, Metallica released the extended play (EP) The $5.98 E.P. - Garage Days Re-Revisited in 1987, which featured cover versions of songs by Diamond Head, Holocaust, Killing Joke, Budgie and Misfits. The band's first studio album with Newsted, ...And Justice for All, was released the following year; the bassist was credited on one song only, opener "Blackened". In 1991 the self-titled Metallica was released, which is considered to be the band's mainstream breakthrough album. Load and Reload followed in 1996 and 1997, respectively. The year after Reload, Metallica released Garage Inc., a double album of cover versions.

After Newsted left in 2001, the bass on 2003's St. Anger was performed by producer Bob Rock, who was also credited with co-writing all of the songs. Robert Trujillo replaced Newsted later that year. Death Magnetic was released in 2008, which was the first to feature Trujillo on bass; all songs were credited as being written by all four band members. Unused recordings from the album's sessions were later released in the form of the EP Beyond Magnetic. In 2011, Metallica released the album Lulu in collaboration with Lou Reed. The band's tenth studio album, Hardwired... to Self-Destruct, was released in November 2016; it was written almost entirely by Hetfield and Ulrich, with Trujillo being co-credited on one song ("ManUNkind") and Hammett receiving no writing credits. The band's eleventh album, 72 Seasons, was released in April 2023.

== Songs ==
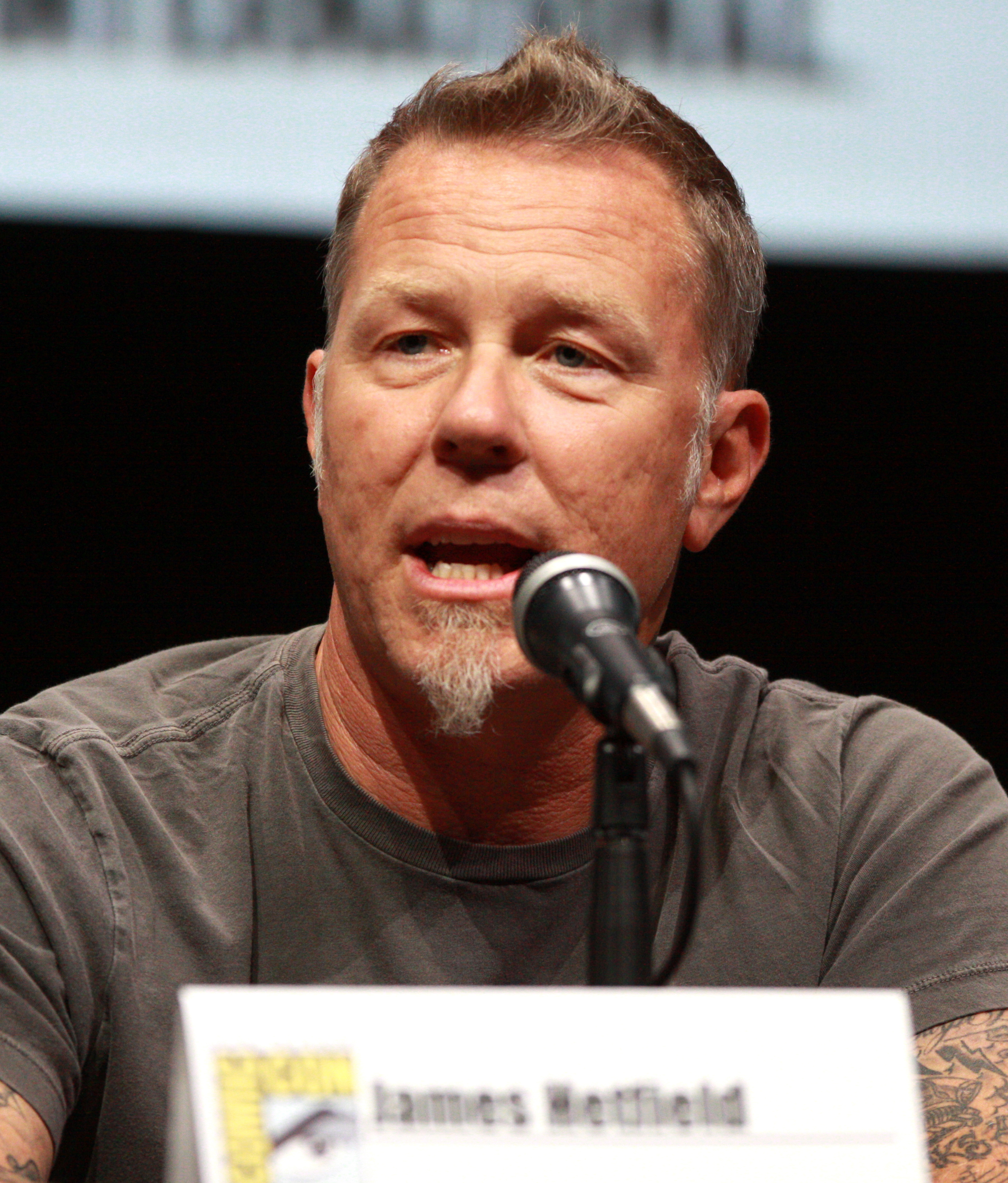
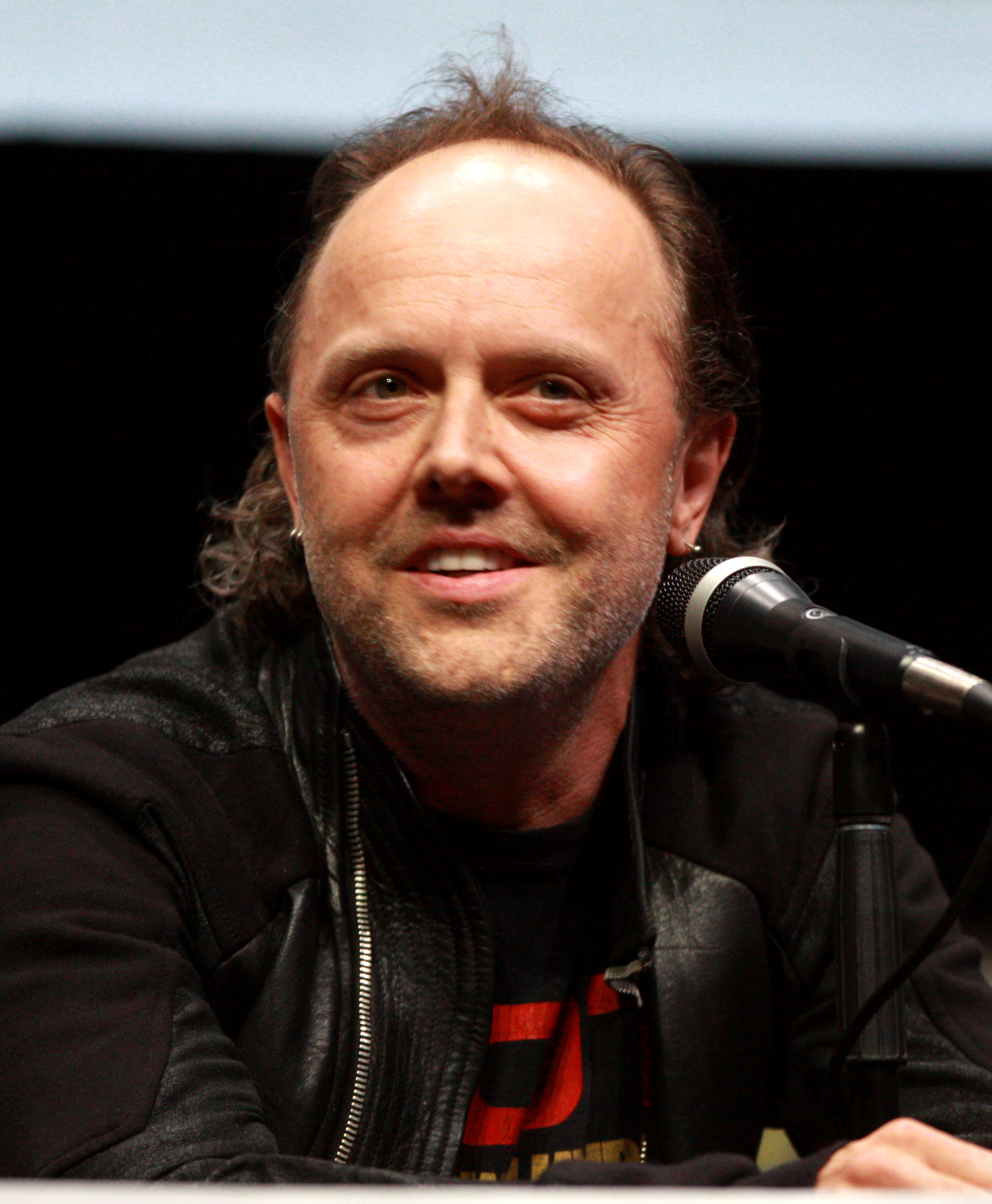
Metallica's songwriting is typically led by the band's two founding and constant members: vocalist and rhythm guitarist James Hetfield (top) and drummer Lars Ulrich (bottom).

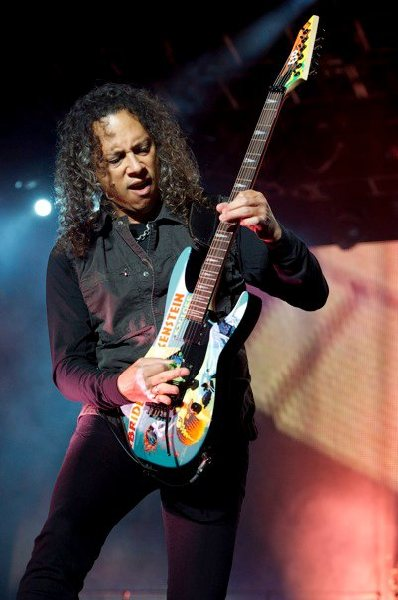
Lead guitarist Kirk Hammett was credited with songwriting on every Metallica album from Ride the Lightning to Death Magnetic.

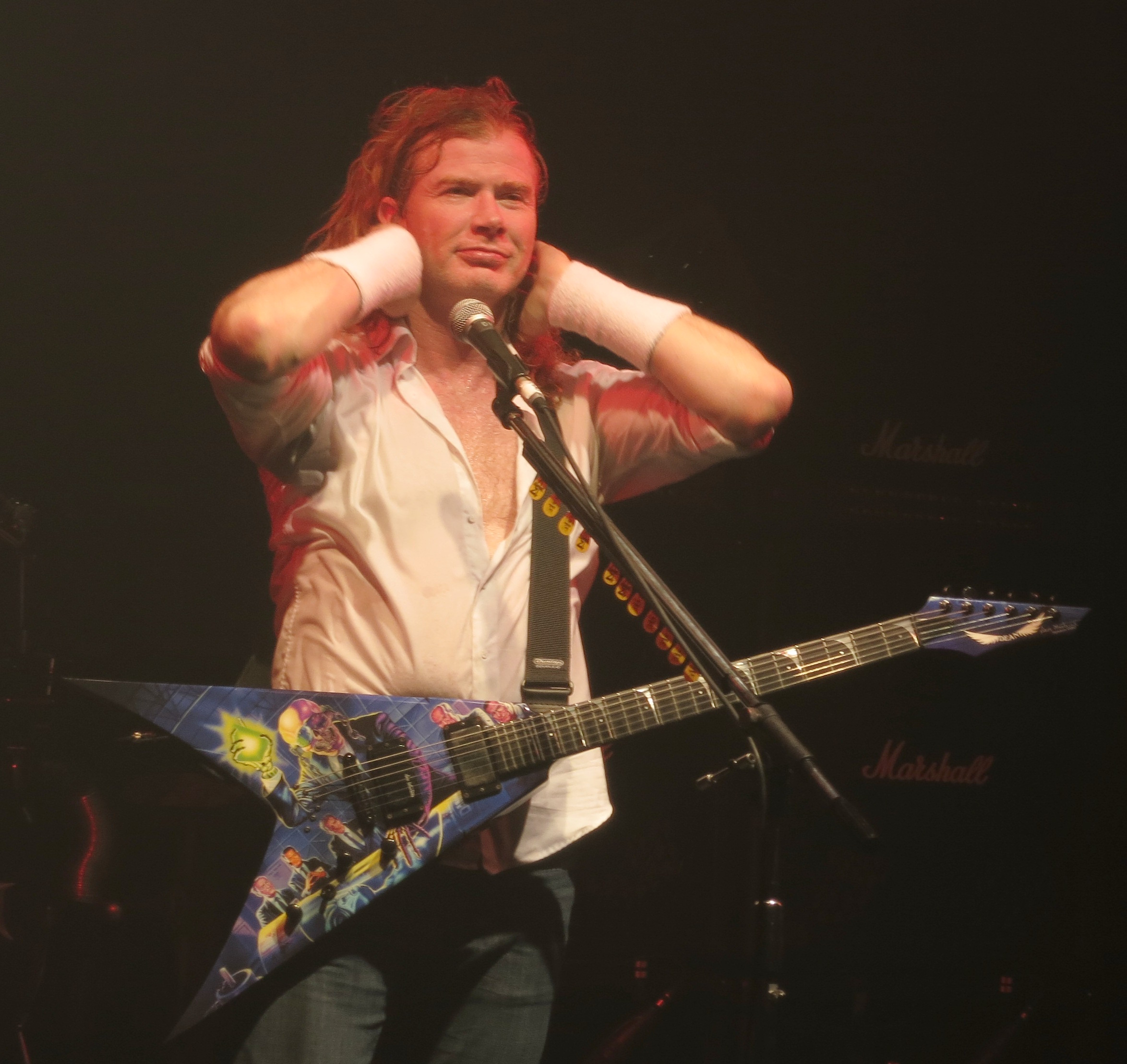
Metallica's original lead guitarist Dave Mustaine co-wrote a number of the band's early songs.

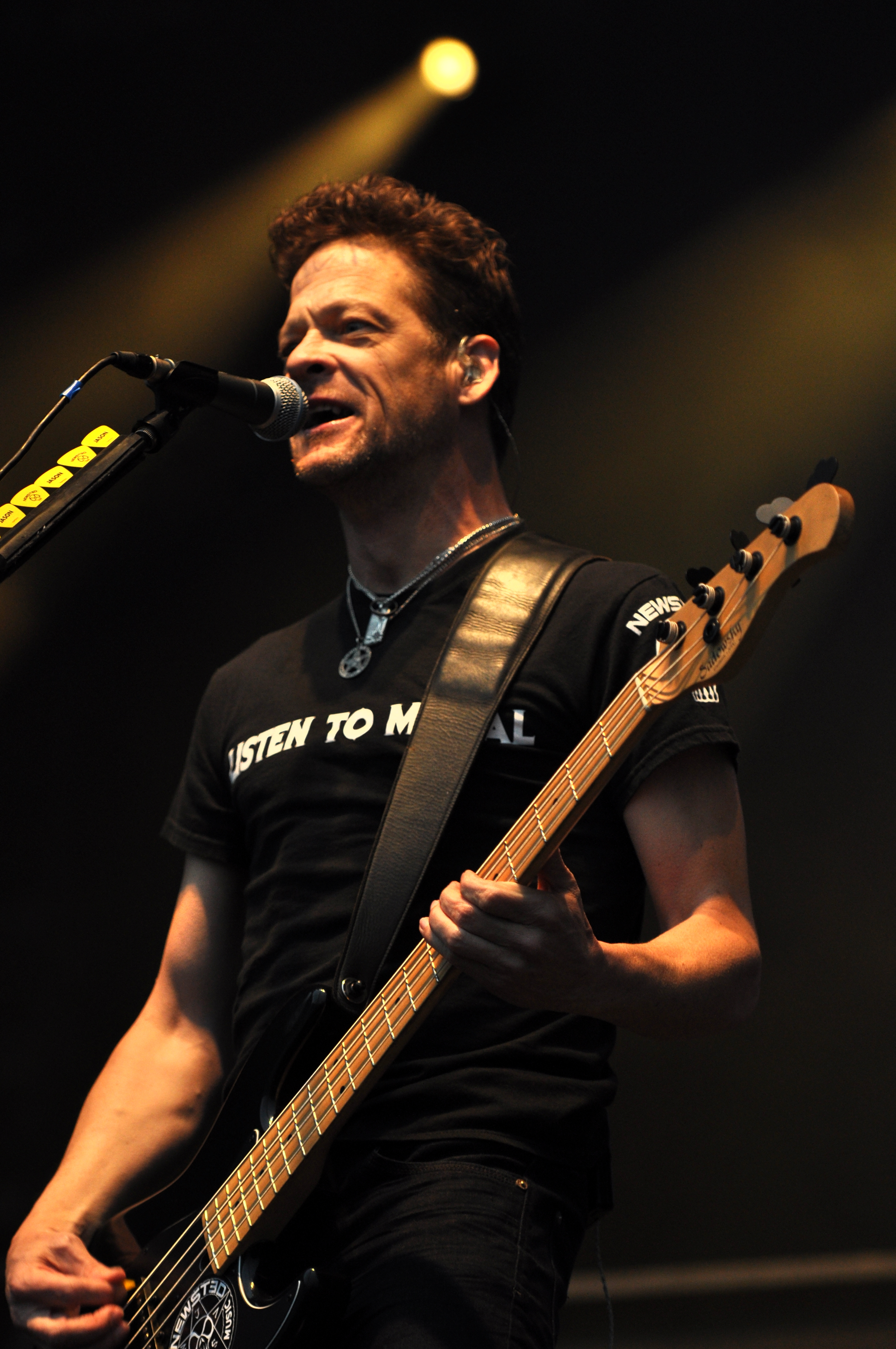
Bassist Jason Newsted joined in 1986, performed on four studio albums and co-wrote three songs.

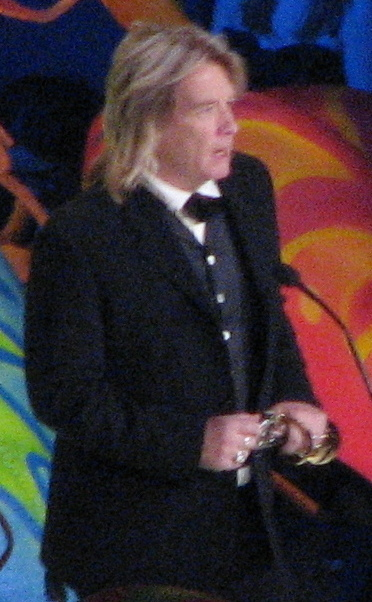
Producer Bob Rock performed bass on St. Anger and was co-credited for writing on all the album's songs.

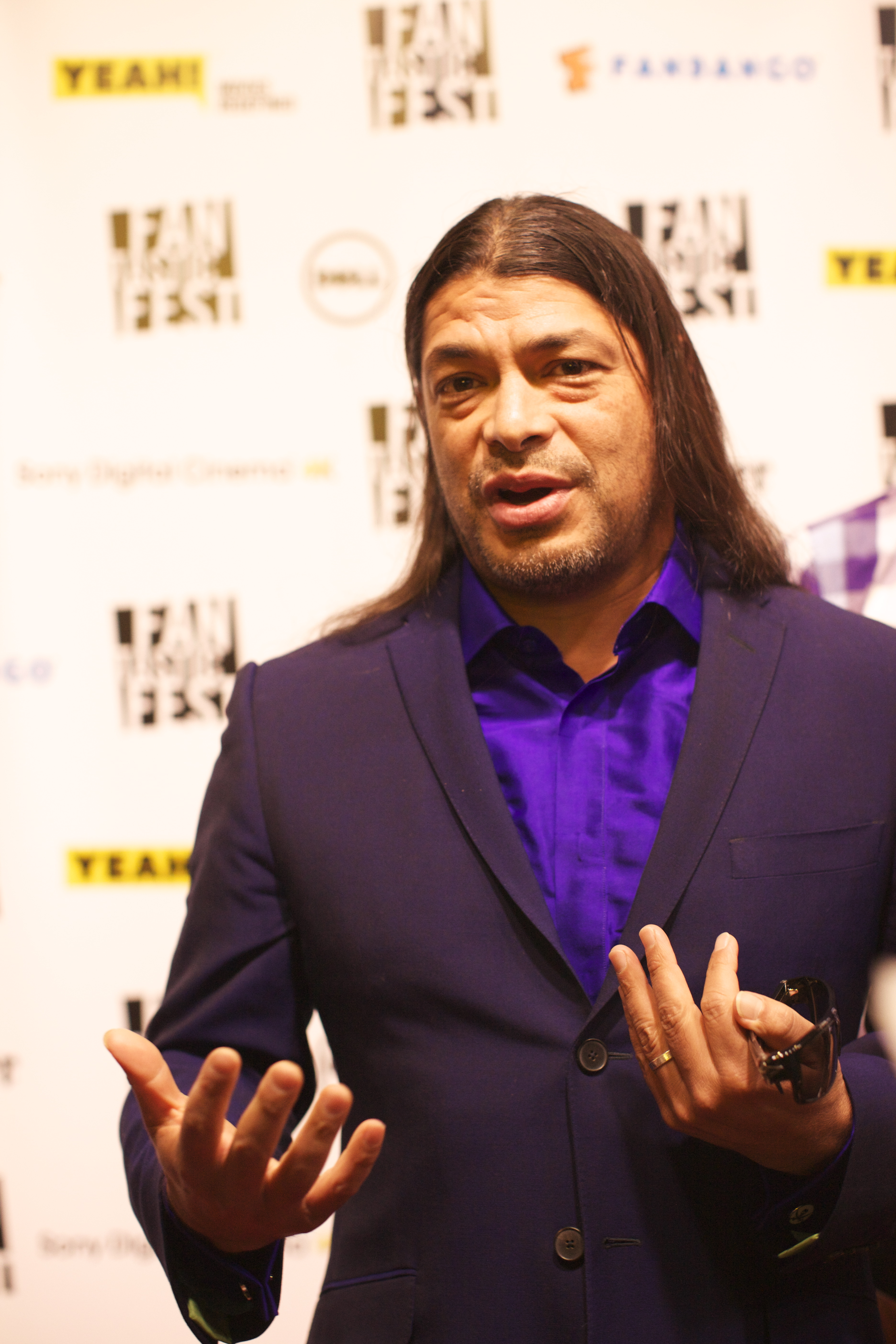
2008's Death Magnetic was credited to the whole band, including recent addition Robert Trujillo.

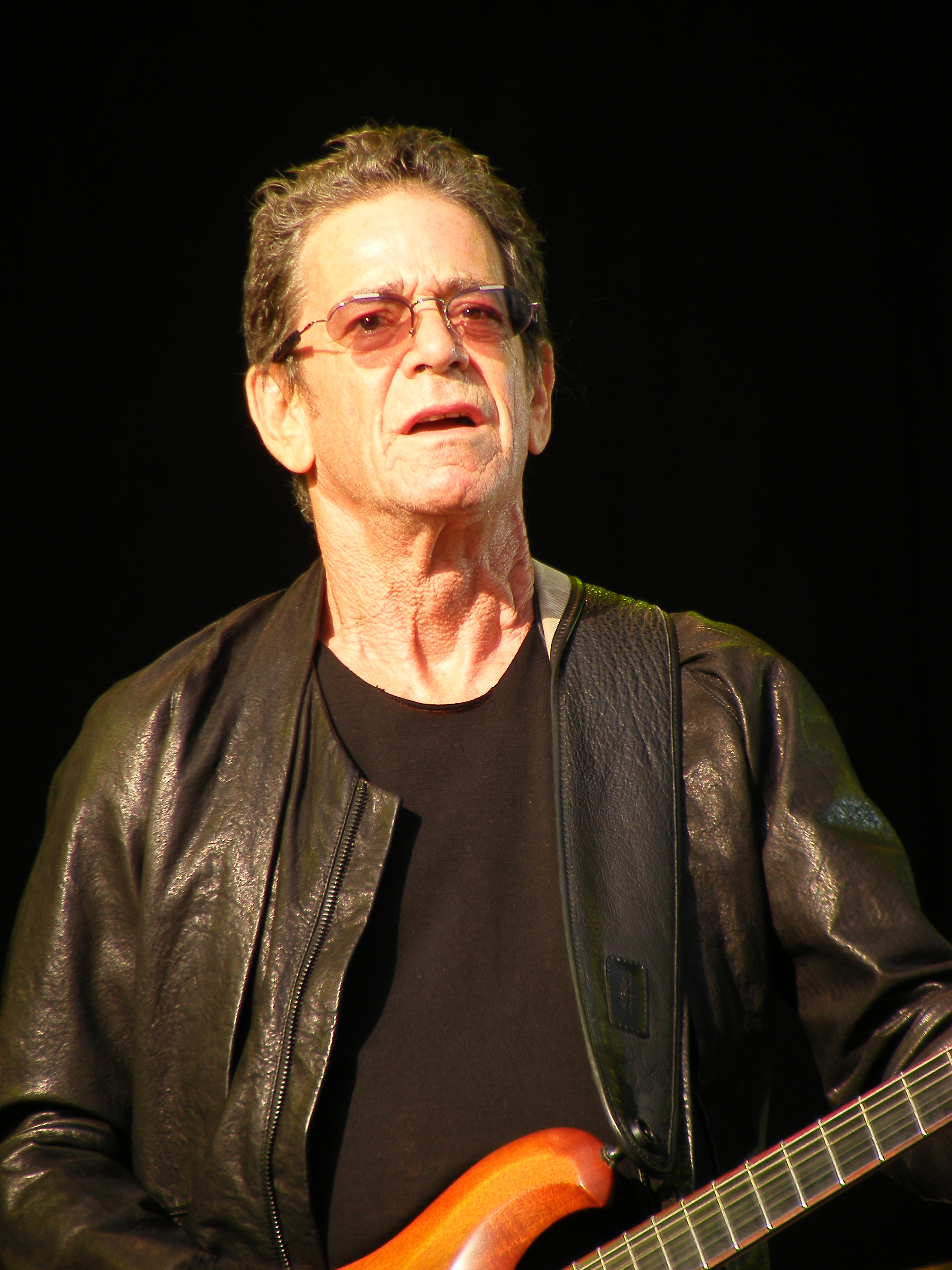
Metallica collaborated with Lou Reed for the concept album Lulu, which was released in 2011.

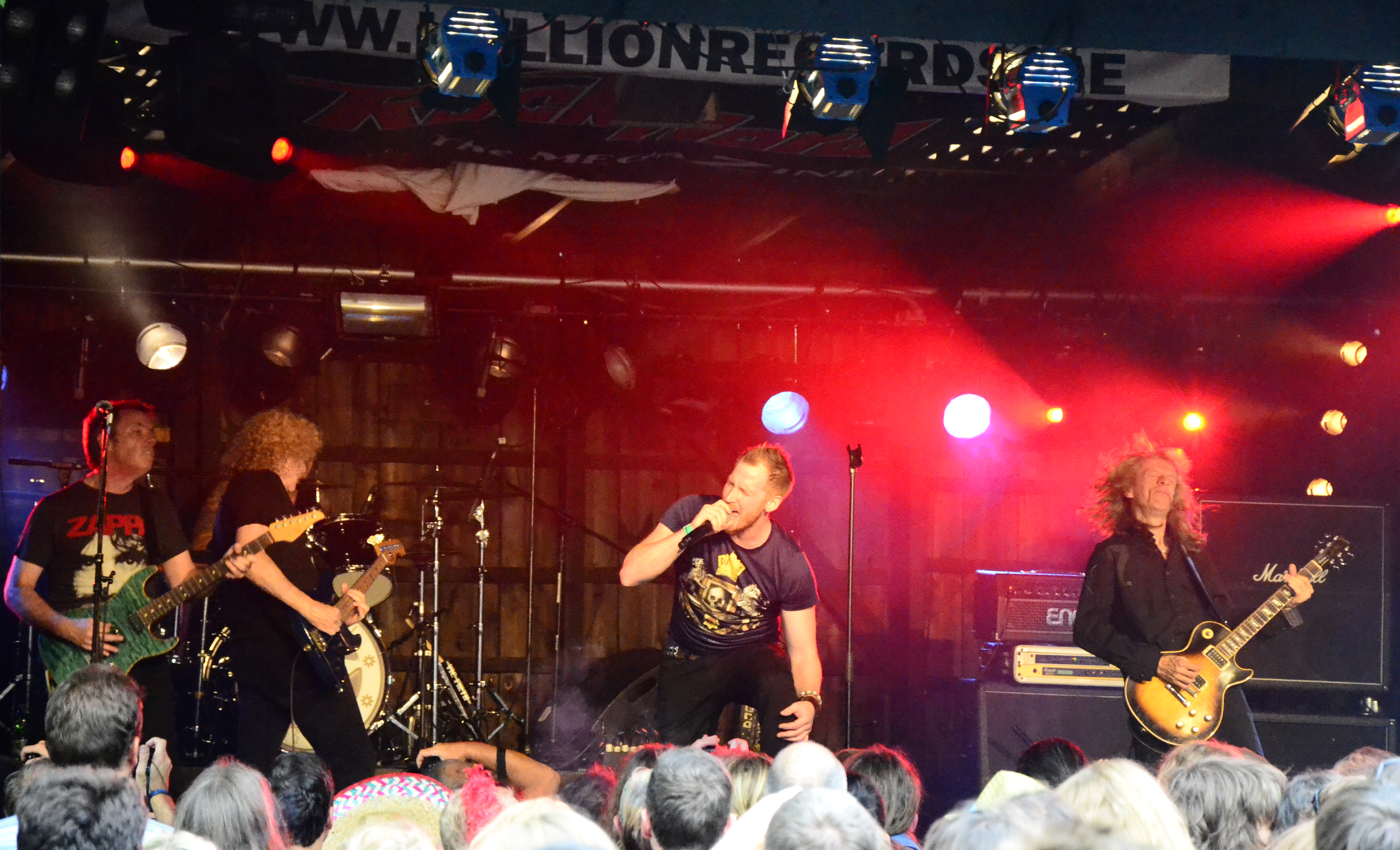
Metallica have recorded cover versions of a number of songs by English group Diamond Head.

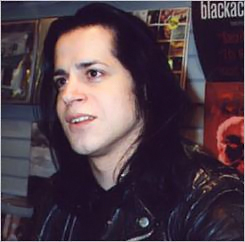
"Die, Die My Darling" and "Last Caress/Green Hell" are Misfits covers originally written by Glenn Danzig.

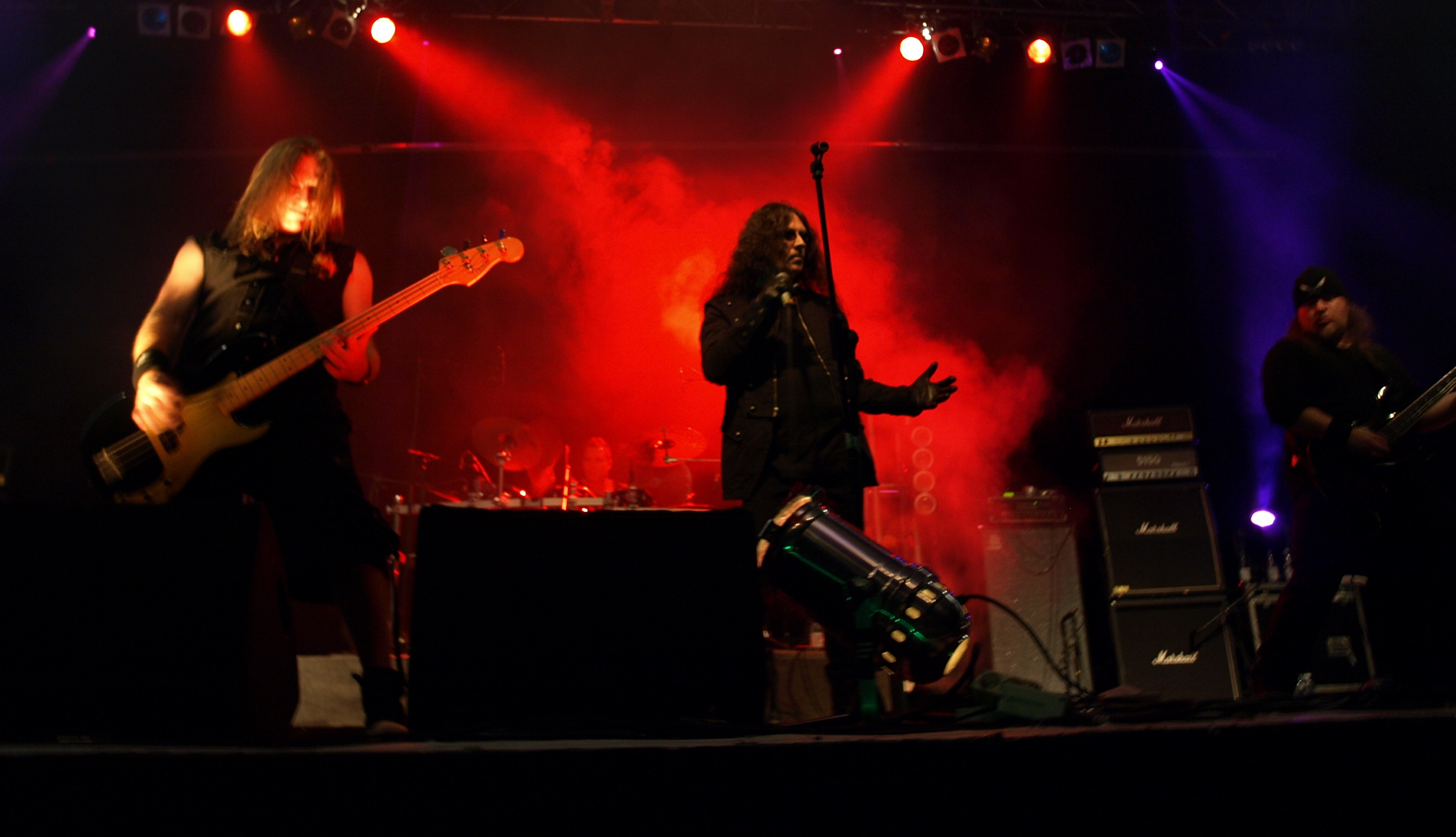
"Creeping Death" contains a cover of "Blitzkrieg", originally recorded by the band of the same name.

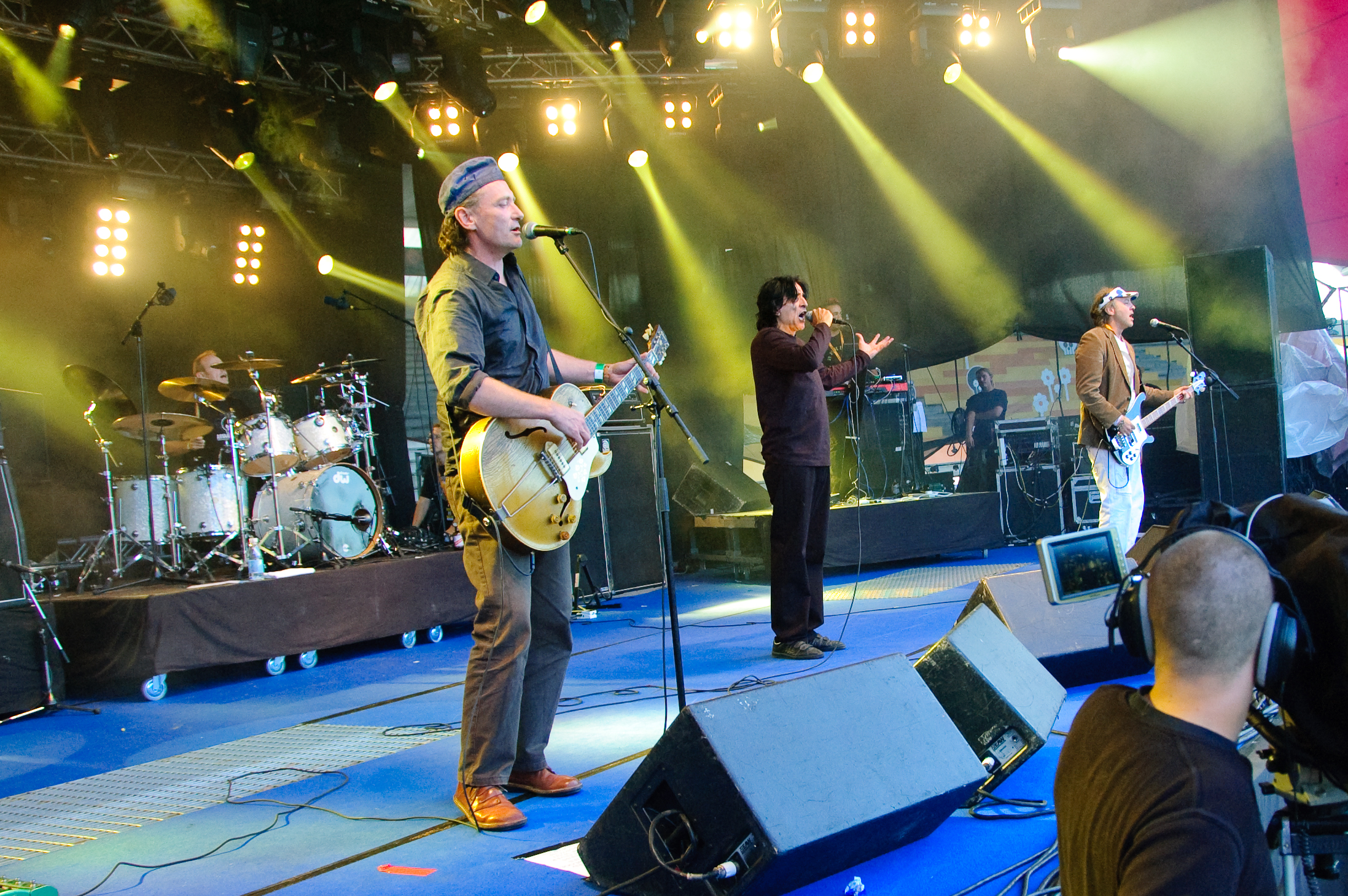
The $5.98 E.P. - Garage Days Re-Revisited contains a recording of the Killing Joke song "The Wait".

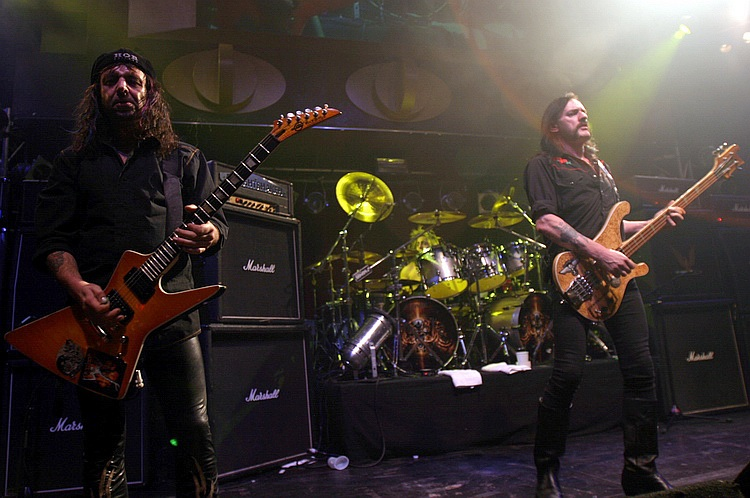
Metallica released covers of four Motörhead songs in 1996.

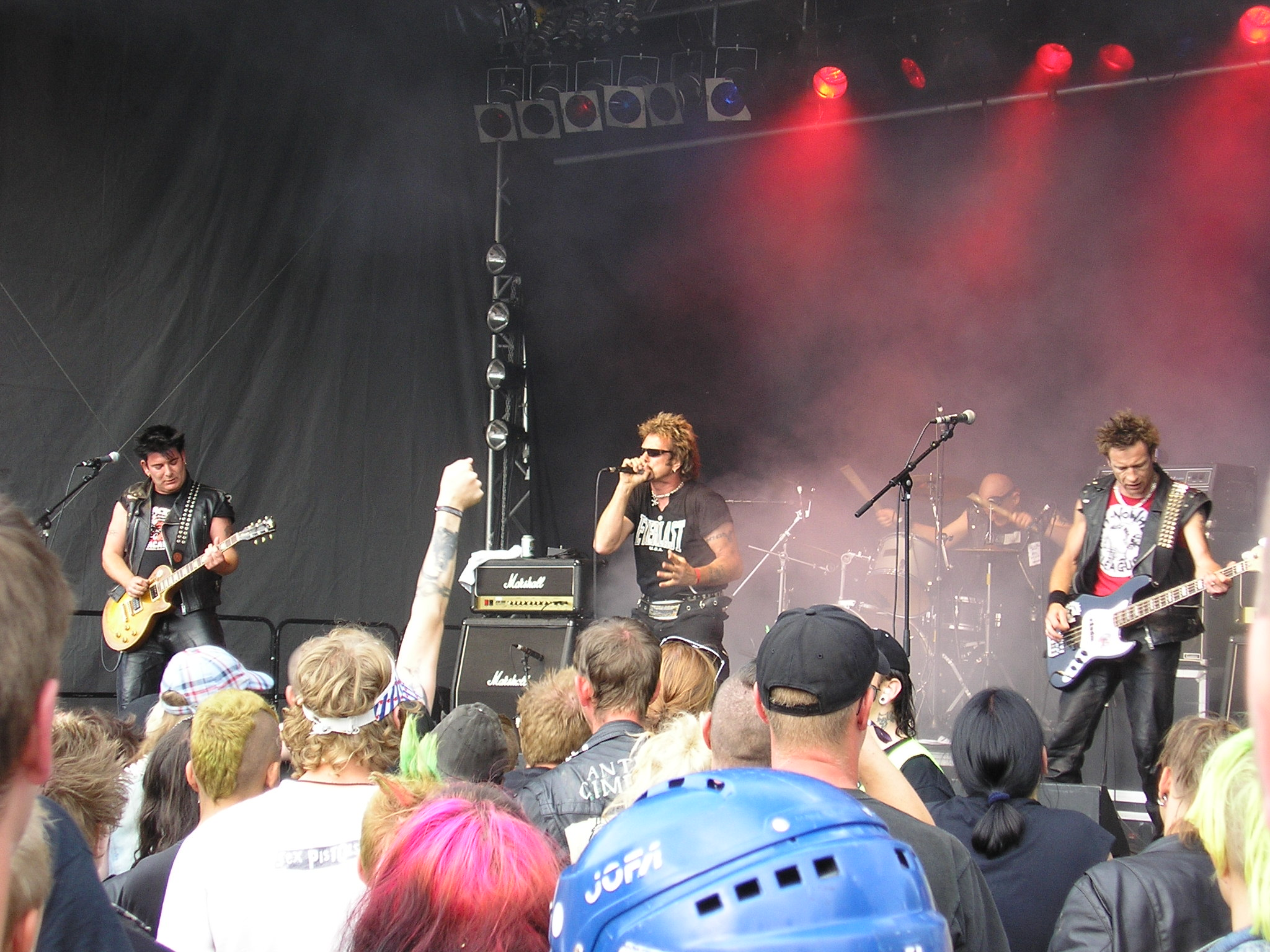
A cover of Anti-Nowhere League's "So What?" has been included on a number of Metallica releases.

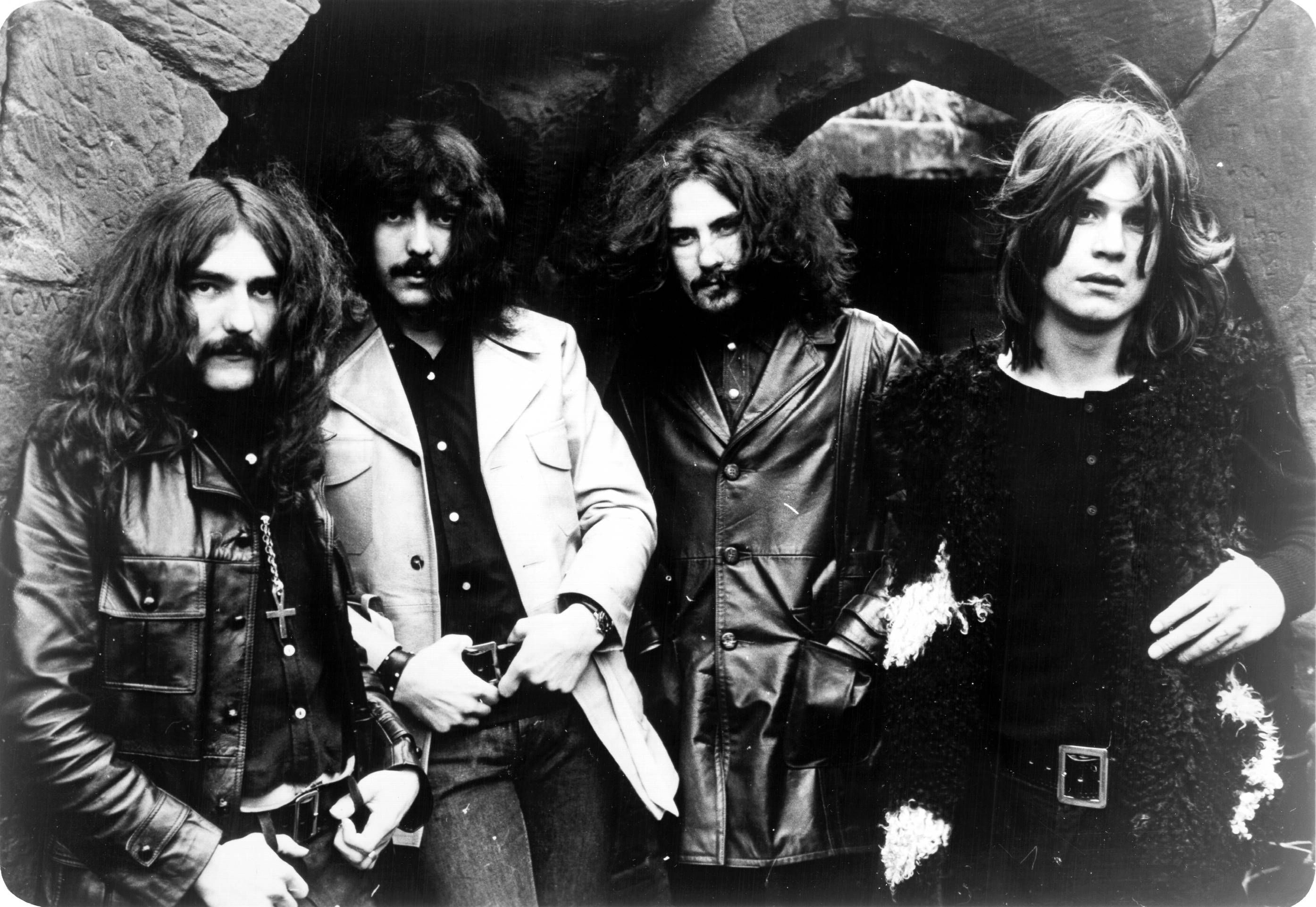
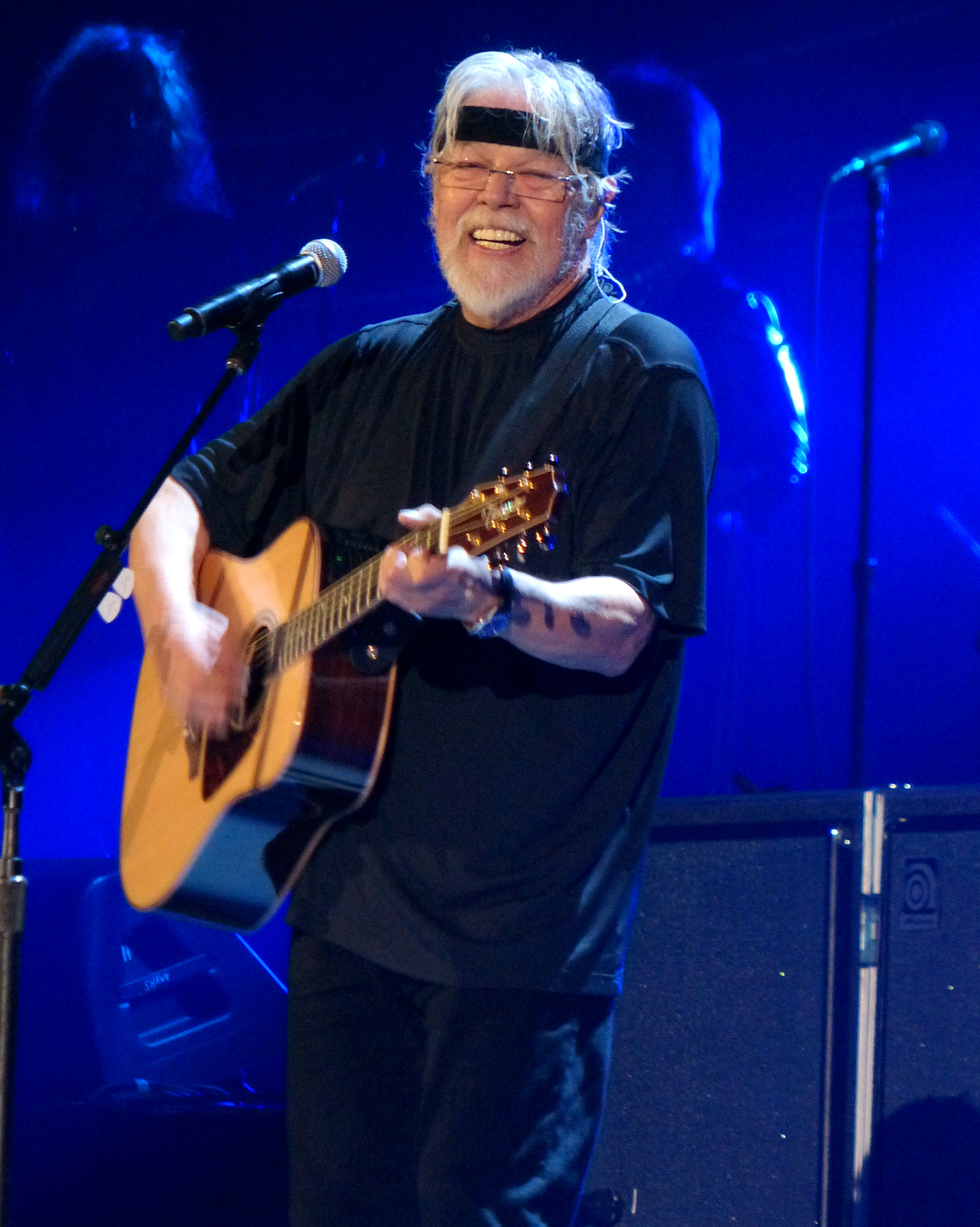
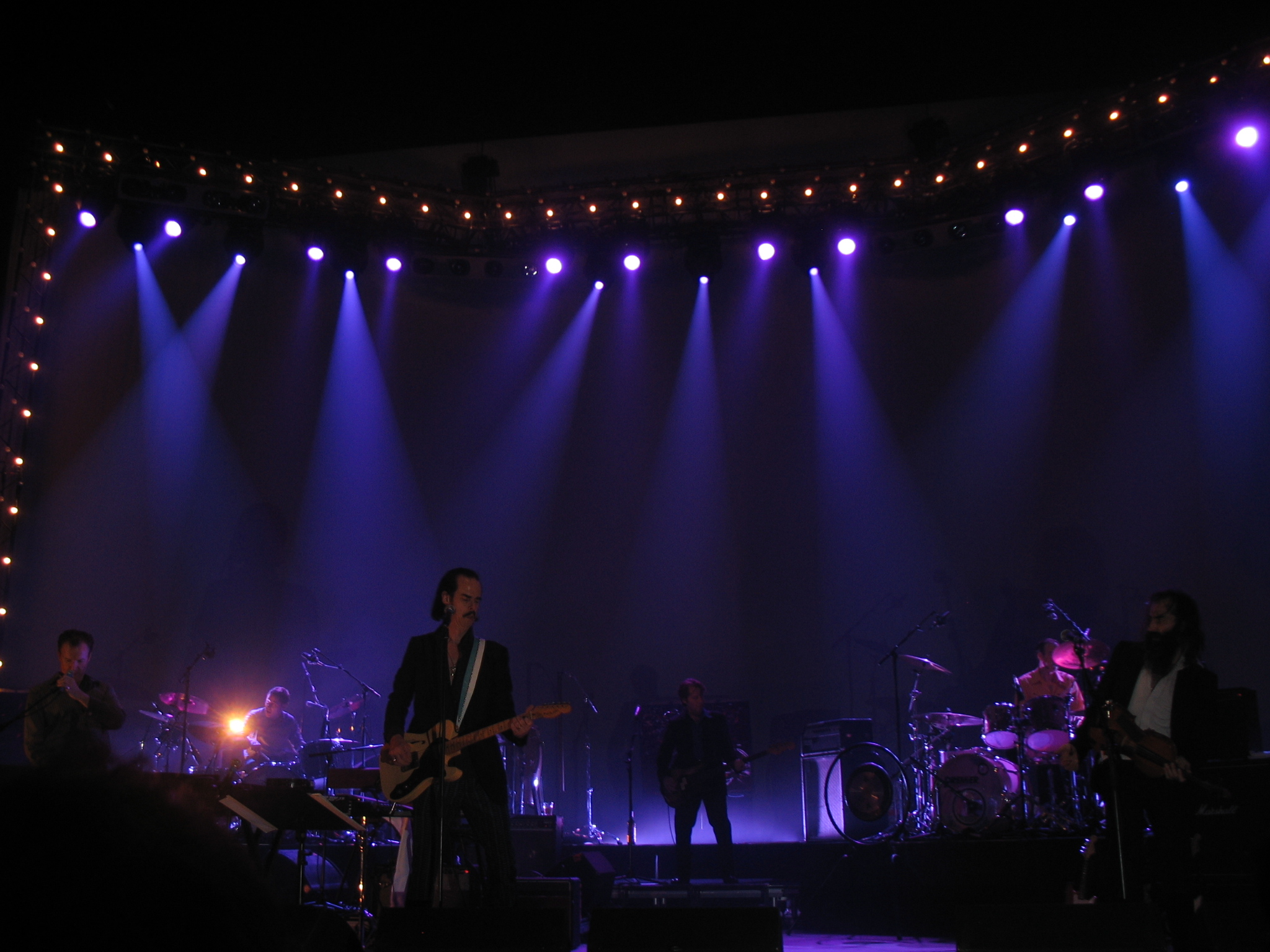
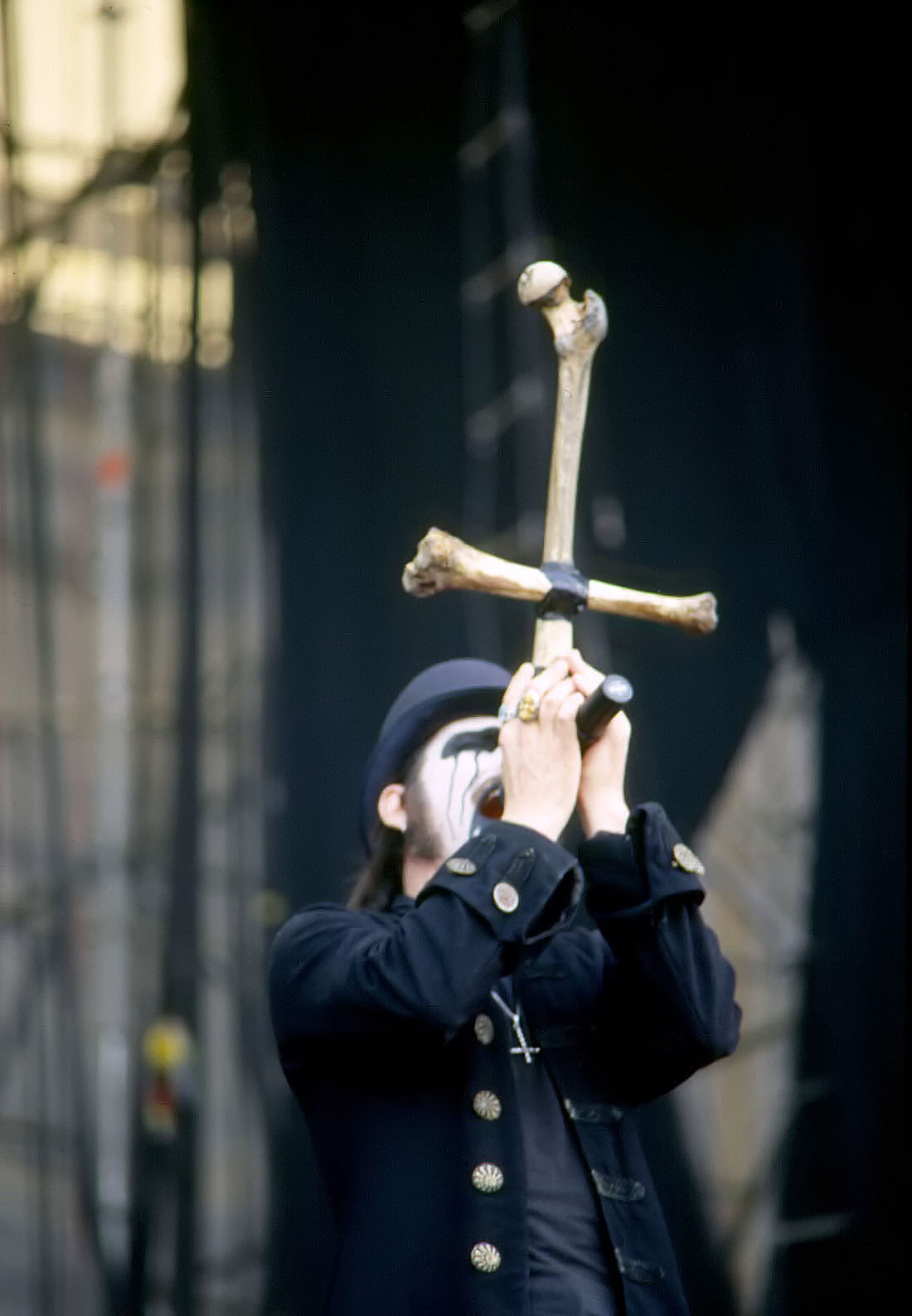
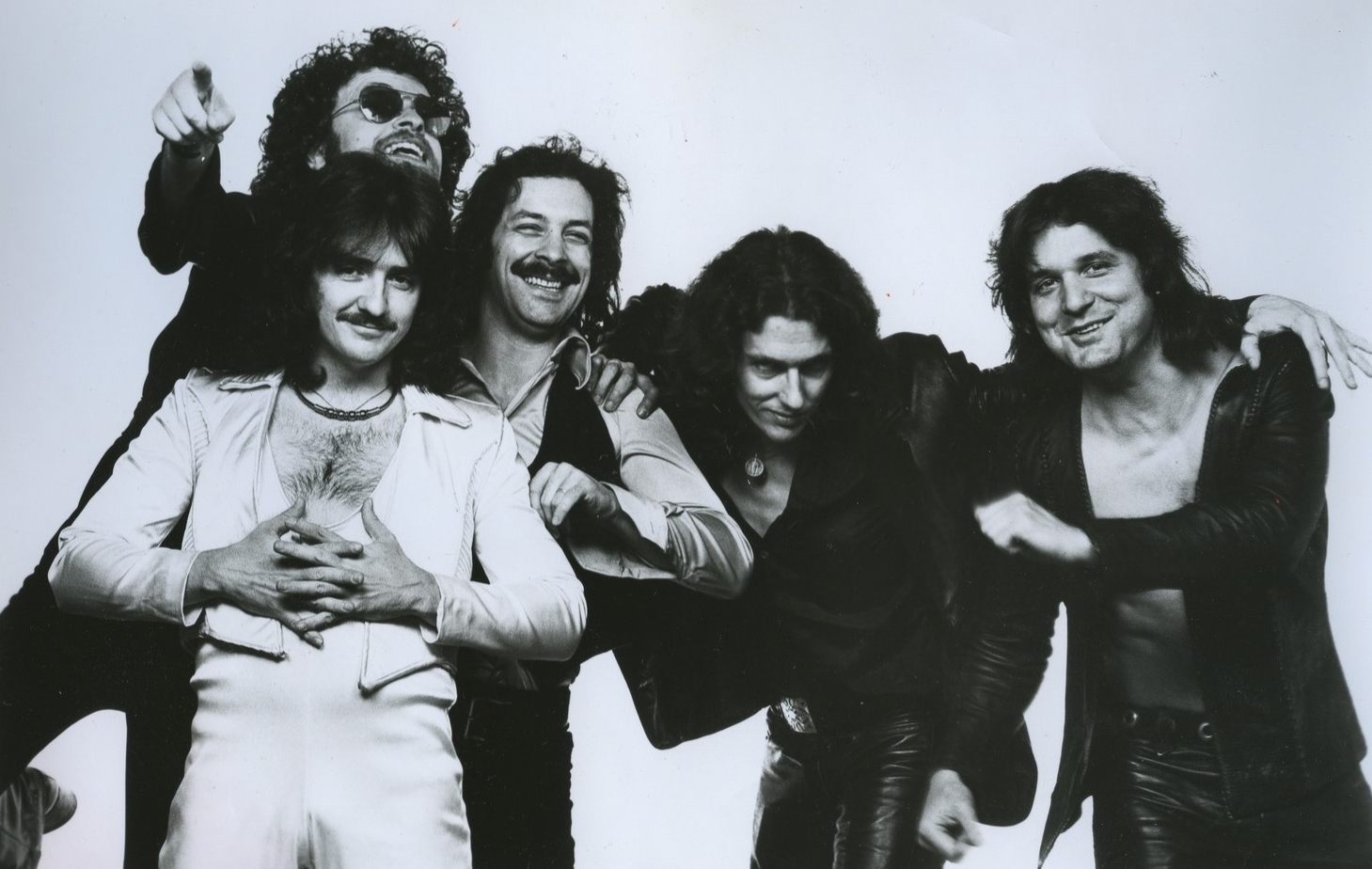
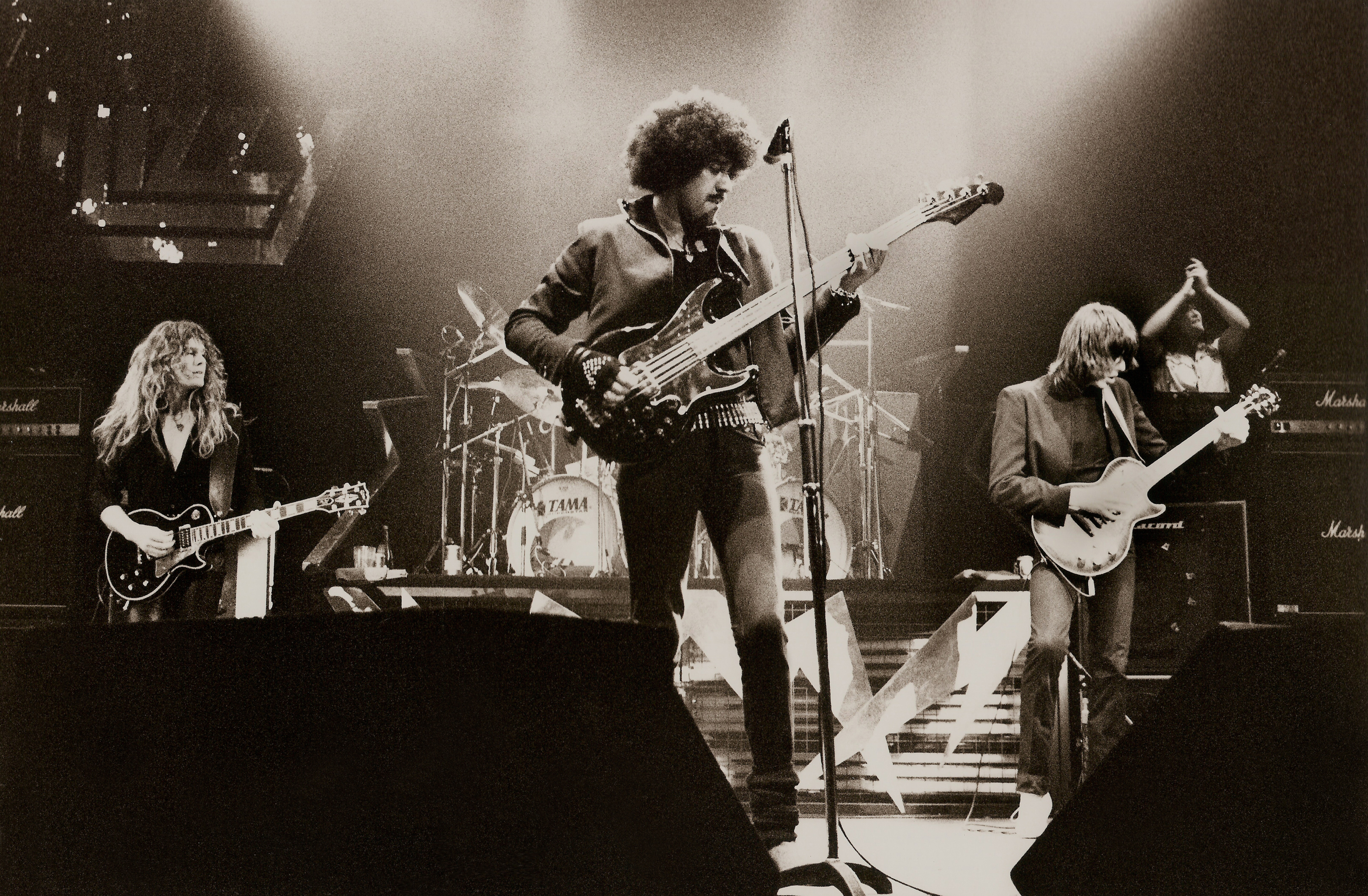
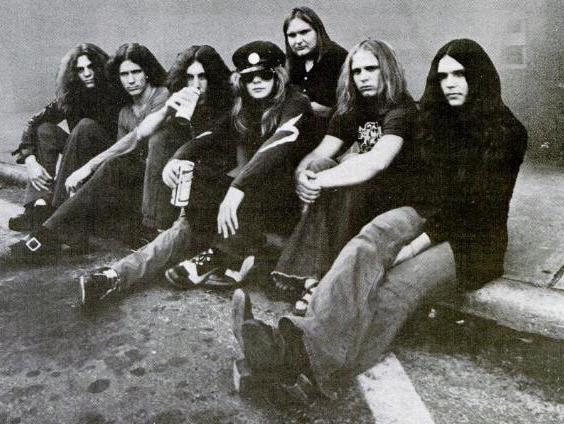
The 1998 cover album Garage Inc. includes cover versions of songs originally recorded by (top to bottom) Black Sabbath, Bob Seger, Nick Cave and the Bad Seeds, Mercyful Fate, Blue Öyster Cult, Thin Lizzy, Lynyrd Skynyrd and more.

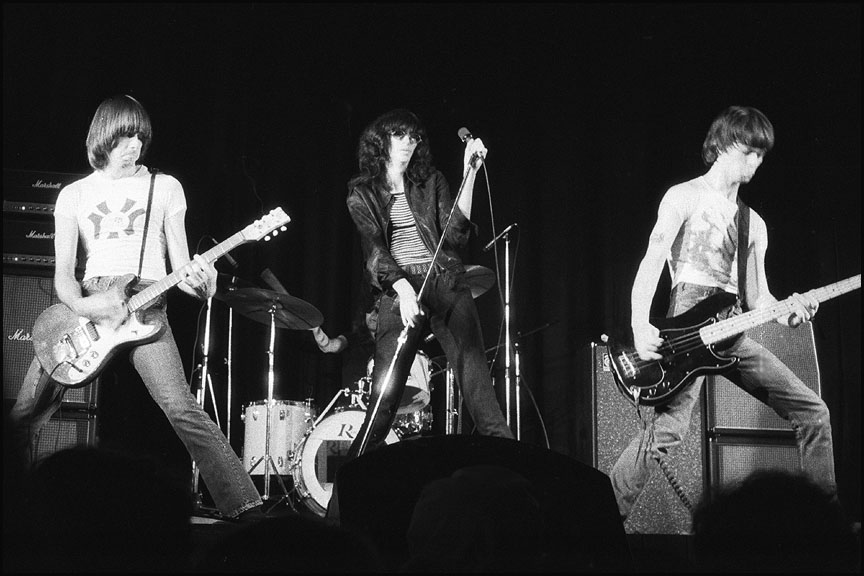
The "St. Anger" single contained cover versions of five songs by punk rock band Ramones.

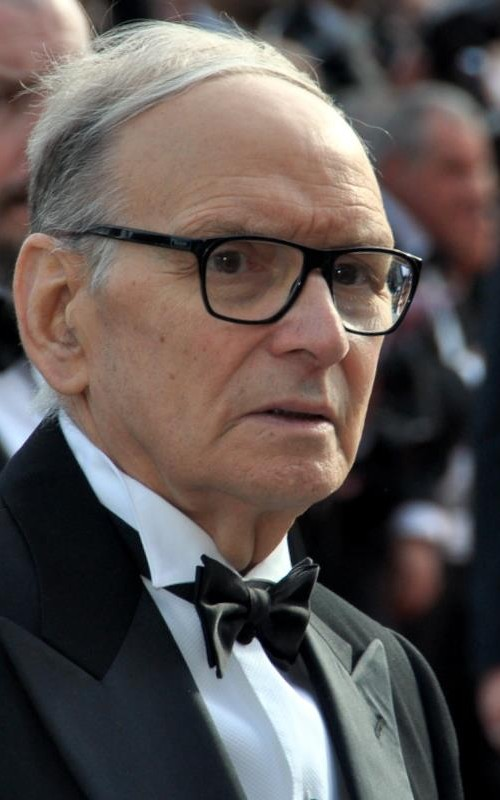
Metallica contributed "The Ecstasy of Gold" by Ennio Morricone to We All Love Ennio Morricone.

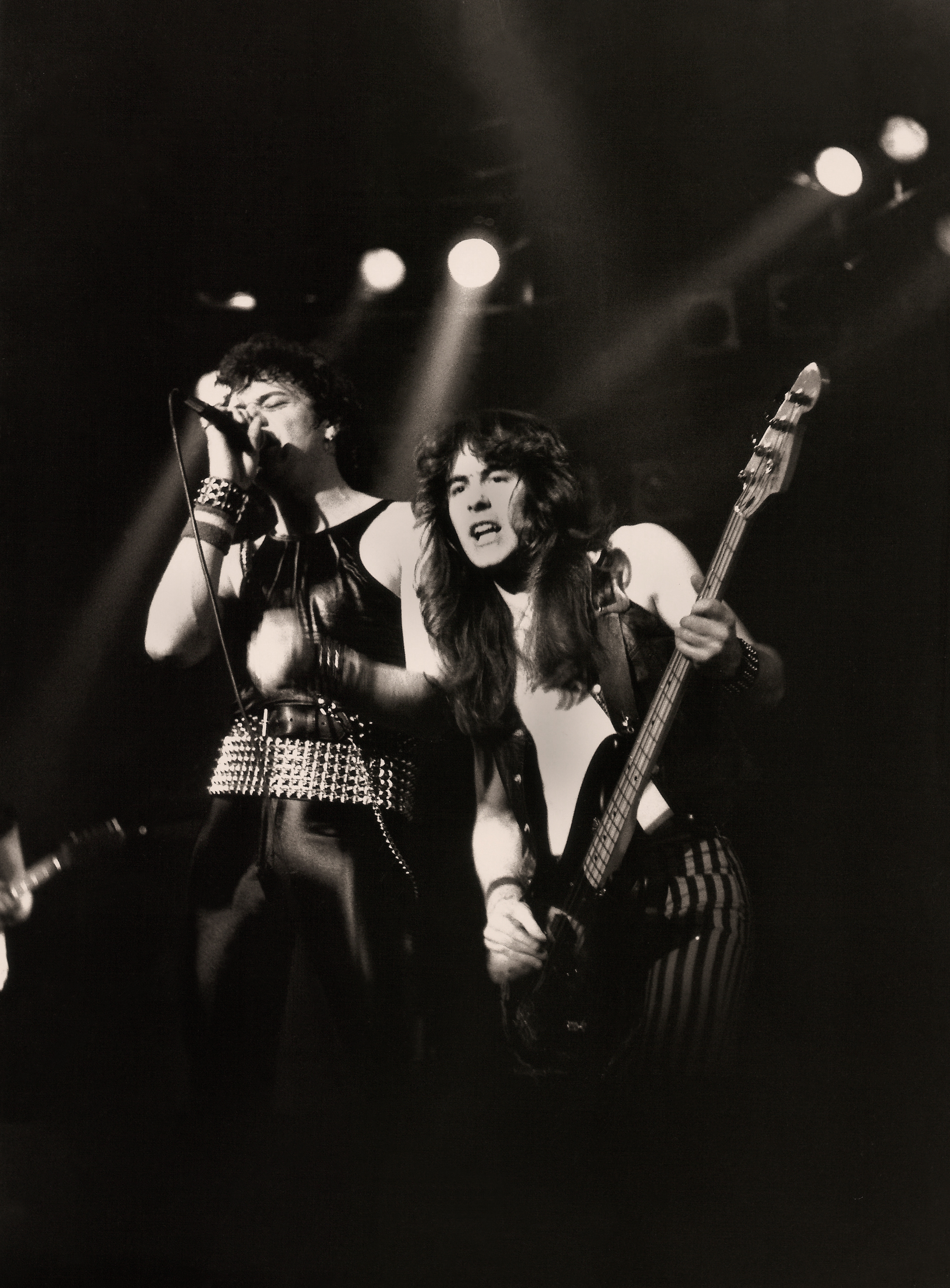
Metallica contributed a cover of Iron Maiden's "Remember Tomorrow" to the tribute album Maiden Heaven.

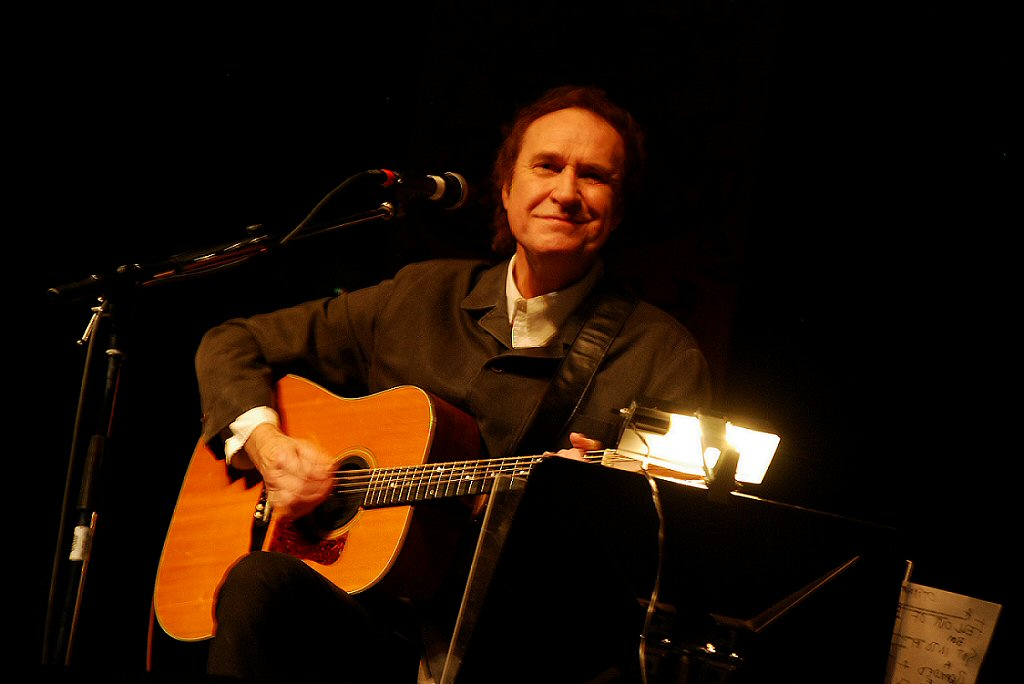
Ray Davies featured Metallica on a recording of "You Really Got Me" included on See My Friends.

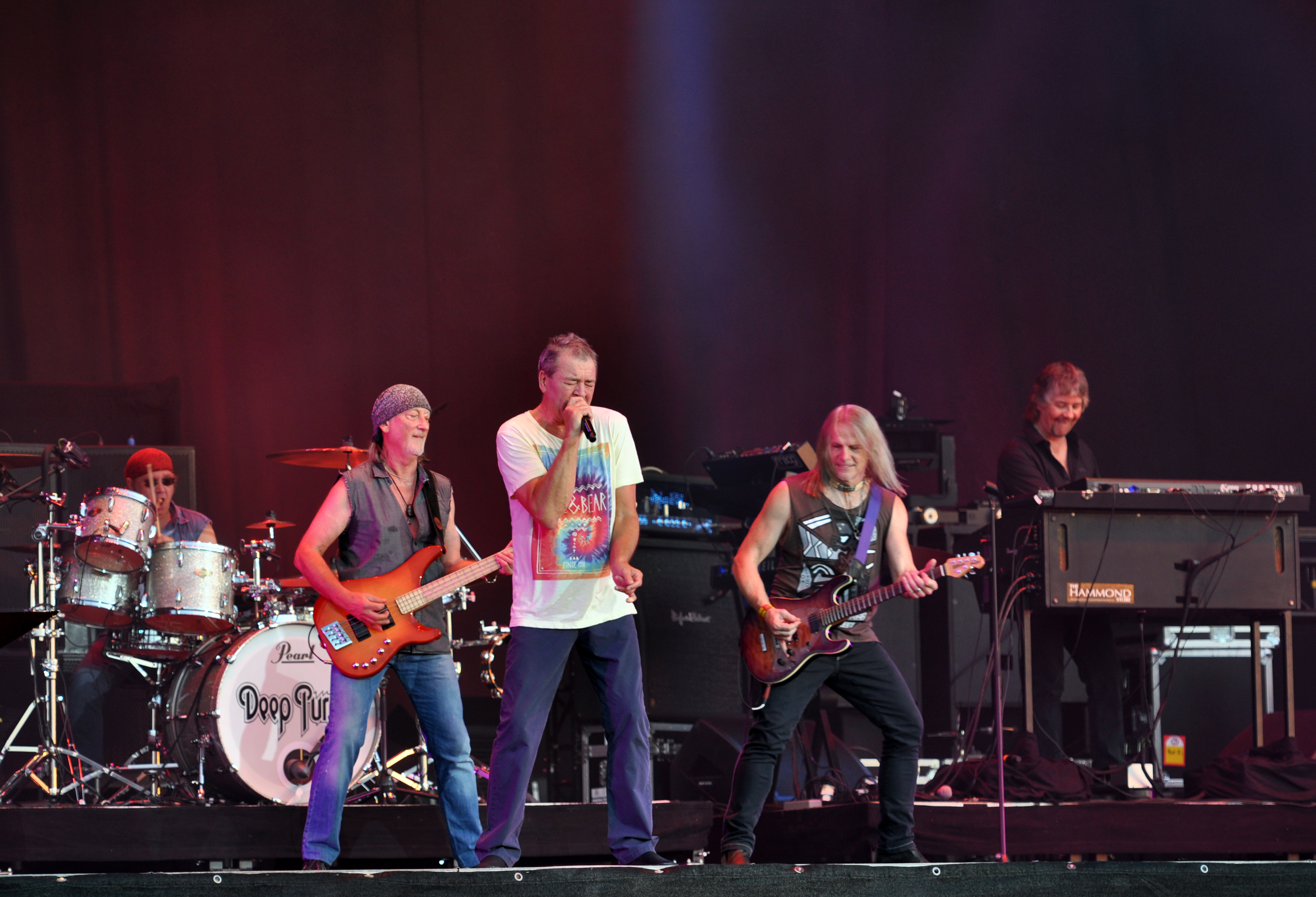
The band recorded a cover of "When a Blind Man Cries" for a Deep Purple tribute album released in 2012.

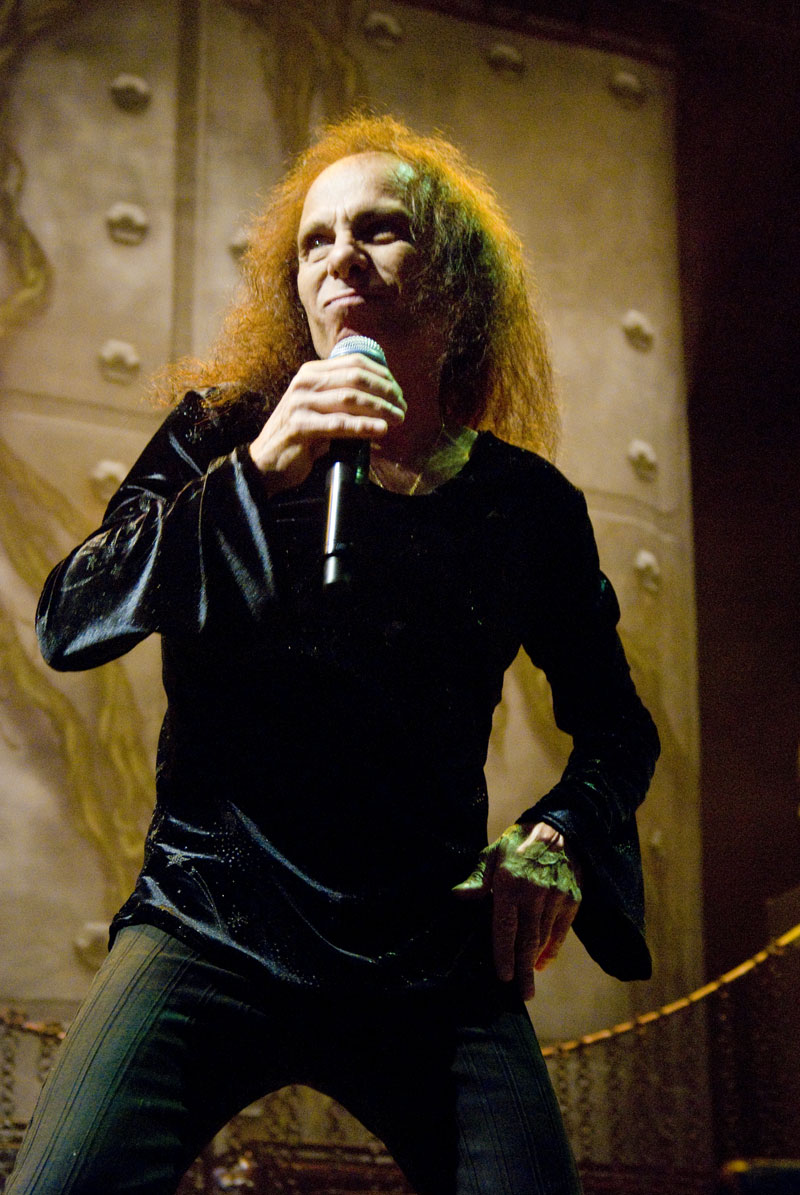
"Ronnie Rising Medley" is a medley of Rainbow songs recorded in tribute to vocalist Ronnie James Dio.

Key
†	Indicates song released as a single
‡	Indicates song written by the whole band

Name of song, writer(s), original artist, original release, and year of release.
Title	Writer(s)	Original artist	Release	Year	Ref.
"2 X 4"	James Hetfield; Lars Ulrich; Kirk Hammett	Metallica	Load	1996	
"53rd & 3rd"	Joey Ramone; Johnny Ramone; Dee Dee Ramone; Tommy Ramone	Ramones	We're a Happy Family: A Tribute to Ramones	2003	
"72 Seasons" †	James Hetfield; Lars Ulrich; Kirk Hammett	Metallica	72 Seasons	2023	
"Ain't My Bitch"	James Hetfield; Lars Ulrich	Metallica	Load	1996	
"All Nightmare Long" †	James Hetfield; Lars Ulrich; Kirk Hammett; Robert Trujillo ‡	Metallica	Death Magnetic	2008	
"All Within My Hands"	James Hetfield; Lars Ulrich; Kirk Hammett; Bob Rock ‡	Metallica	St. Anger	2003	
"Am I Evil?"	Sean Harris; Brian Tatler	Diamond Head	"Creeping Death" (Note: "Am I Evil?" was also included on the 1988 reissue of Kill 'Em All and on Garage Inc.)	1984	
"Am I Savage?"	James Hetfield; Lars Ulrich	Metallica	Hardwired... to Self-Destruct	2016	
"...And Justice for All"	James Hetfield; Lars Ulrich; Kirk Hammett	Metallica	...And Justice for All	1988	
"(Anesthesia) – Pulling Teeth"	Cliff Burton	Metallica	Kill 'Em All	1983	
"Astronomy"	Joe Bouchard; Albert Bouchard; Sandy Pearlman	Blue Öyster Cult	Garage Inc.	1998	
"Atlas, Rise!" †	James Hetfield; Lars Ulrich	Metallica	Hardwired... to Self-Destruct	2016	
"Attitude"	James Hetfield; Lars Ulrich	Metallica	Reload	1997	
"Bad Seed"	James Hetfield; Lars Ulrich; Kirk Hammett	Metallica	Reload	1997	
"Battery"	James Hetfield; Lars Ulrich	Metallica	Master of Puppets	1986	
"Better Than You" †	James Hetfield; Lars Ulrich	Metallica	Reload	1997	
"Blackened"	James Hetfield; Lars Ulrich; Jason Newsted	Metallica	...And Justice for All	1988	
"Bleeding Me" †	James Hetfield; Lars Ulrich; Kirk Hammett	Metallica	Load	1996	
"Blitzkrieg"	Ian Jones; Jim Sirotto; Brian Ross	Blitzkrieg	"Creeping Death" (Note: "Blitzkrieg" was also included on the 1988 reissue of Kill 'Em All and on Garage Inc.)	1984	
"Brandenburg Gate" (with Lou Reed)	Lou Reed; James Hetfield; Lars Ulrich; Kirk Hammett; Robert Trujillo ‡	Lou Reed and Metallica	Lulu	2011	
"Breadfan"	Burke Shelley; Tony Bourge; Ray Phillips	Budgie	"Harvester of Sorrow" (Note: "Breadfan" was also included on "Eye of the Beholder", "One" and Garage Inc.)	1988	
"Broken, Beat & Scarred" †	James Hetfield; Lars Ulrich; Kirk Hammett; Robert Trujillo ‡	Metallica	Death Magnetic	2008	
"The Call of Ktulu"	James Hetfield; Lars Ulrich; Cliff Burton; Dave Mustaine	Metallica	Ride the Lightning	1984	
"Carpe Diem Baby"	James Hetfield; Lars Ulrich; Kirk Hammett	Metallica	Reload	1997	
"Chasing Light"	James Hetfield; Lars Ulrich; Kirk Hammett	Metallica	72 Seasons	2023	
"Cheat on Me" (with Lou Reed)	Lou Reed; James Hetfield; Lars Ulrich; Kirk Hammett; Robert Trujillo ‡	Lou Reed and Metallica	Lulu	2011	
"Commando"	Joey Ramone; Johnny Ramone; Dee Dee Ramone; Tommy Ramone	Ramones	"St. Anger"	2003	
"Confusion"	James Hetfield; Lars Ulrich	Metallica	Hardwired... to Self-Destruct	2016	
"Crash Course in Brain Surgery"	Burke Shelley; Tony Bourge; Ray Phillips	Budgie	The $5.98 E.P.: Garage; Days Re-Revisited (Note: "Crash Course in Brain Surgery" was also included on Garage Inc.)	1987	
"Creeping Death" †	James Hetfield; Lars Ulrich; Cliff Burton; Kirk Hammett ‡	Metallica	Ride the Lightning	1984	
"Cretin Hop"	Joey Ramone; Johnny Ramone; Dee Dee Ramone; Tommy Ramone	Ramones	"St. Anger"	2003	
"Crown of Barbed Wire"	James Hetfield; Lars Ulrich; Kirk Hammett	Metallica	72 Seasons	2023	
"Cure"	James Hetfield; Lars Ulrich	Metallica	Load	1996	
"Cyanide" †	James Hetfield; Lars Ulrich; Kirk Hammett; Robert Trujillo ‡	Metallica	Death Magnetic	2008	
"Damage Case"	Lemmy Kilmister; Eddie Clarke; Phil Taylor; Mick Farren	Motörhead	"Hero of the Day" (Note: "Damage Case" was also included on Garage Inc.)	1996	
"Damage, Inc."	James Hetfield; Lars Ulrich; Cliff Burton; Kirk Hammett ‡	Metallica	Master of Puppets	1986	
"The Day That Never Comes" †	James Hetfield; Lars Ulrich; Kirk Hammett; Robert Trujillo ‡	Metallica	Death Magnetic	2008	
"Devil's Dance"	James Hetfield; Lars Ulrich	Metallica	Reload	1997	
"Die, Die My Darling" (Note: "Die, Die My Darling" was originally recorded by Misfits.) †	Glenn Danzig	Misfits	Garage Inc.	1998	
"Dirty Window"	James Hetfield; Lars Ulrich; Kirk Hammett; Bob Rock ‡	Metallica	St. Anger	2003	
"Disposable Heroes"	James Hetfield; Lars Ulrich; Kirk Hammett	Metallica	Master of Puppets	1986	
"Don't Tread on Me"	James Hetfield; Lars Ulrich	Metallica	Metallica	1991	
"Dragon" (with Lou Reed)	Lou Reed; James Hetfield; Lars Ulrich; Kirk Hammett; Robert Trujillo ‡	Lou Reed and Metallica	Lulu	2011	
"Dream No More"	James Hetfield; Lars Ulrich	Metallica	Hardwired... to Self-Destruct	2016	
"Dyers Eve"	James Hetfield; Lars Ulrich; Kirk Hammett	Metallica	...And Justice for All	1988	
"The Ecstasy of Gold"	Ennio Morricone	Ennio Morricone	We All Love Ennio Morricone	2007	
"The End of the Line"	James Hetfield; Lars Ulrich; Kirk Hammett; Robert Trujillo ‡	Metallica	Death Magnetic	2008	
"Enter Sandman" †	James Hetfield; Lars Ulrich; Kirk Hammett	Metallica	Metallica	1991	
"Escape"	James Hetfield; Lars Ulrich; Kirk Hammett	Metallica	Ride the Lightning	1984	
"Eye of the Beholder †	James Hetfield; Lars Ulrich; Kirk Hammett	Metallica	...And Justice for All	1988	
"Fade to Black"	James Hetfield; Lars Ulrich; Cliff Burton; Kirk Hammett ‡	Metallica	Ride the Lightning	1984	
"Fight Fire with Fire"	James Hetfield; Lars Ulrich; Cliff Burton	Metallica	Ride the Lightning	1984	
"Fixxxer"	James Hetfield; Lars Ulrich; Kirk Hammett	Metallica	Reload	1997	
"For Whom the Bell Tolls"	James Hetfield; Lars Ulrich; Cliff Burton	Metallica	Ride the Lightning	1984	
"The Four Horsemen"	James Hetfield; Lars Ulrich; Dave Mustaine	Metallica	Kill 'Em All	1983	
"Frantic" †	James Hetfield; Lars Ulrich; Kirk Hammett; Bob Rock ‡	Metallica	St. Anger	2003	
"The Frayed Ends of Sanity"	James Hetfield; Lars Ulrich; Kirk Hammett	Metallica	...And Justice for All	1988	
"Free Speech for the Dumb"	Garry Maloney; Kevin Morris; Tony Roberts; Roy Wainwright	Discharge	Garage Inc.	1998	
"Frustration" (with Lou Reed)	Lou Reed; James Hetfield; Lars Ulrich; Kirk Hammett; Robert Trujillo ‡	Lou Reed and Metallica	Lulu	2011	
"Fuel" †	James Hetfield; Lars Ulrich; Kirk Hammett	Metallica	Reload	1997	
"The God That Failed"	James Hetfield; Lars Ulrich	Metallica	Metallica	1991	
"Halo on Fire"	James Hetfield; Lars Ulrich	Metallica	Hardwired... to Self-Destruct	2016	
"Hardwired" †	James Hetfield; Lars Ulrich	Metallica	Hardwired... to Self-Destruct	2016	
"Harvester of Sorrow" †	James Hetfield; Lars Ulrich	Metallica	...And Justice for All	1988	
"Hate Train"	James Hetfield; Lars Ulrich; Kirk Hammett; Robert Trujillo‡	Metallica	Beyond Magnetic	2011	
"Hell and Back"	James Hetfield; Lars Ulrich; Kirk Hammett; Robert Trujillo ‡	Metallica	Beyond Magnetic	2011	
"Helpless"	Sean Harris; Brian Tatler	Diamond Head	The $5.98 E.P.: Garage; Days Re-Revisited (Note: "Helpless" was also included on Garage Inc.)	1987	
"Here Comes Revenge"	James Hetfield; Lars Ulrich	Metallica	Hardwired... to Self-Destruct	2016	
"Hero of the Day" †	James Hetfield; Lars Ulrich; Kirk Hammett	Metallica	Load	1996	
"Hit the Lights"	James Hetfield; Lars Ulrich	Metallica	Kill 'Em All	1983	
"Holier Than Thou"	James Hetfield; Lars Ulrich	Metallica	Metallica	1991	
"The House Jack Built"	James Hetfield; Lars Ulrich; Kirk Hammett	Metallica	Load	1996	
"I Disappear" †	James Hetfield; Lars Ulrich	Metallica	Mission: Impossible II	2000	
"Iced Honey" (with Lou Reed)	Lou Reed; James Hetfield; Lars Ulrich; Kirk Hammett; Robert Trujillo ‡	Lou Reed and Metallica	Lulu	2011	
"If Darkness Had a Son" †	James Hetfield; Lars Ulrich; Kirk Hammett	Metallica	72 Seasons	2023	
"Inamorata"	James Hetfield; Lars Ulrich	Metallica	72 Seasons	2023	
"Invisible Kid"	James Hetfield; Lars Ulrich; Kirk Hammett; Bob Rock ‡	Metallica	St. Anger	2003	
"It's Electric"	Sean Harris; Brian Tatler	Diamond Head	Garage Inc.	1998	
"The Judas Kiss" †	James Hetfield; Lars Ulrich; Kirk Hammett; Robert Trujillo ‡	Metallica	Death Magnetic	2008	
"Jump in the Fire" †	James Hetfield; Lars Ulrich; Dave Mustaine	Metallica	Kill 'Em All	1983	
"Junior Dad" (with Lou Reed)	Lou Reed; James Hetfield; Lars Ulrich; Kirk Hammett; Robert Trujillo ‡	Lou Reed and Metallica	Lulu	2011	
"Just a Bullet Away"	James Hetfield; Lars Ulrich; Kirk Hammett; Robert Trujillo ‡	Metallica	Beyond Magnetic	2011	
"Killing Time"	Vivian Campbell; Trevor Fleming; Raymond Haller; Davy Bates	Sweet Savage	"The Unforgiven" (Note: "Killing Time" was also included on Garage Inc.)	1991	
"King Nothing" †	James Hetfield; Lars Ulrich; Kirk Hammett	Metallica	Load	1996	
"Last Caress/Green Hell"	Glenn Danzig	Misfits	The $5.98 E.P.: Garage; Days Re-Revisited (Note: "Last Caress/Green Hell", a medley of "Last Caress" and "Green Hell", both of which were originally recorded by Misfits, was also included on Garage Inc.)	1987	
"Leper Messiah"	James Hetfield; Lars Ulrich	Metallica	Master of Puppets	1986	
"Little Dog" (with Lou Reed)	Lou Reed; James Hetfield; Lars Ulrich; Kirk Hammett; Robert Trujillo ‡	Lou Reed and Metallica	Lulu	2011	
"Lords of Summer" †	James Hetfield; Lars Ulrich; Robert Trujillo	Metallica	"Lords of Summer"	2014	
"Loverman"	Nick Cave	Nick Cave and the Bad Seeds	Garage Inc.	1998	
"Low Man's Lyric"	James Hetfield; Lars Ulrich	Metallica	Reload	1997	
"Lux Æterna" †	James Hetfield; Lars Ulrich	Metallica	72 Seasons	2023	
"Mama Said" †	James Hetfield; Lars Ulrich	Metallica	Load	1996	
"ManUNkind"	James Hetfield; Lars Ulrich; Robert Trujillo	Metallica	Hardwired... to Self-Destruct	2016	
"Master of Puppets" †	James Hetfield; Lars Ulrich; Cliff Burton; Kirk Hammett ‡	Metallica	Master of Puppets	1986	
"The Memory Remains" †	James Hetfield; Lars Ulrich	Metallica	Reload	1997	
"Mercyful Fate" (Note: "Mercyful Fate" is a medley of "Satan's Fall", "Curse of the Pharaohs", "A Corpse Without Soul", "Into the Coven" and "Evil".)	King Diamond; Hank Shermann	Mercyful Fate	Garage Inc.	1998	
"Metal Militia"	James Hetfield; Lars Ulrich; Dave Mustaine	Metallica	Kill 'Em All	1983	
"– Human" (Note: Pronounced "Minus Human")	James Hetfield; Lars Ulrich	Metallica with Michael Kamen conducting the San Francisco Symphony Orchestra	S&M	1999	
"Mistress Dread" (with Lou Reed)	Lou Reed; James Hetfield; Lars Ulrich; Kirk Hammett; Robert Trujillo ‡	Lou Reed and Metallica	Lulu	2011	
"The More I See"	Garry Maloney; Kevin Morris; Peter Purtill; Roy Wainwright	Discharge	Garage Inc.	1998	
"Moth into Flame" †	James Hetfield; Lars Ulrich	Metallica	Hardwired... to Self-Destruct	2016	
"Motorbreath"	James Hetfield	Metallica	Kill 'Em All	1983	
"Murder One"	James Hetfield; Lars Ulrich	Metallica	Hardwired... to Self-Destruct	2016	
"My Apocalypse" †	James Hetfield; Lars Ulrich; Kirk Hammett; Robert Trujillo ‡	Metallica	Death Magnetic	2008	
"My Friend of Misery"	James Hetfield; Lars Ulrich; Jason Newsted	Metallica	Metallica	1991	
"My World"	James Hetfield; Lars Ulrich; Kirk Hammett; Bob Rock ‡	Metallica	St. Anger	2003	
"No Leaf Clover" †	James Hetfield; Lars Ulrich	Metallica with Michael Kamen conducting the San Francisco Symphony Orchestra	S&M	1999	
"No Remorse"	James Hetfield; Lars Ulrich	Metallica	Kill 'Em All	1983	
"Nothing Else Matters" †	James Hetfield; Lars Ulrich	Metallica	Metallica	1991	
"Now I Wanna Sniff Some Glue"	Joey Ramone; Johnny Ramone; Dee Dee Ramone; Tommy Ramone	Ramones	"St. Anger"	2003	
"Now That We're Dead"	James Hetfield; Lars Ulrich	Metallica	Hardwired... to Self-Destruct	2016	
"Of Wolf and Man"	James Hetfield; Lars Ulrich; Kirk Hammett	Metallica	Metallica	1991	
"One" †	James Hetfield; Lars Ulrich	Metallica	...And Justice for All	1988	
"Orion"	James Hetfield; Lars Ulrich; Cliff Burton	Metallica	Master of Puppets	1986	
"The Outlaw Torn"	James Hetfield; Lars Ulrich	Metallica	Load	1996	
"Overkill"	Lemmy Kilmister; Eddie Clarke; Phil Taylor	Motörhead	"Until It Sleeps" (Note: "Overkill" was also included on "Hero of the Day" and Garage Inc.)	1996	
"Phantom Lord"	James Hetfield; Lars Ulrich; Dave Mustaine	Metallica	Kill 'Em All	1983	
"Poor Twisted Me"	James Hetfield; Lars Ulrich	Metallica	Load	1996	
"The Prince"	Sean Harris; Brian Tatler	Diamond Head	"Harvester of Sorrow" (Note: "The Prince", was also included on the Japanese version of ...And Justice for All, and on "One"and Garage Inc.)	1988	
"Prince Charming"	James Hetfield; Lars Ulrich	Metallica	Reload	1997	
"Pumping Blood" (with Lou Reed)	Lou Reed; James Hetfield; Lars Ulrich; Kirk Hammett; Robert Trujillo ‡	Lou Reed and Metallica	Lulu	2011	
"Purify"	James Hetfield; Lars Ulrich; Kirk Hammett; Bob Rock ‡	Metallica	St. Anger	2003	
"Rebel of Babylon"	James Hetfield; Lars Ulrich; Kirk Hammett; Robert Trujillo ‡	Metallica	Beyond Magnetic	2011	
"Remember Tomorrow"	Steve Harris; Paul Di'Anno	Iron Maiden	Maiden Heaven: A Tribute to Iron Maiden	2008	
"Ride the Lightning"	James Hetfield; Lars Ulrich; Cliff Burton; Dave Mustaine	Metallica	Ride the Lightning	1984	
"Ronnie"	James Hetfield; Lars Ulrich	Metallica	Load	1996	
"Ronnie Rising Medley" (Note: "Ronnie Rising Medley" is a medley of "A Light in the Black", "Tarot Woman", "Stargazer" and "Kill the King", which were originally recorded by Rainbow.)	Ritchie Blackmore; Ronnie James Dio; Cozy Powell	Rainbow	Ronnie James Dio: This Is Your Life	2014	
"Room of Mirrors"	James Hetfield; Lars Ulrich	Metallica	72 Seasons	2023	
"Sabbra Cadabra" (Note: "Sabbra Cadabra" contains elements of "A National Acrobat", both of which were originally recorded by Black Sabbath.)	Tony Iommi; Ozzy Osbourne; Geezer Butler; Bill Ward	Black Sabbath	Garage Inc.	1998	
"Sad but True" †	James Hetfield; Lars Ulrich	Metallica	Metallica	1991	
"St. Anger" †	James Hetfield; Lars Ulrich; Kirk Hammett; Bob Rock ‡	Metallica	St. Anger	2003	
"Screaming Suicide" †	James Hetfield; Lars Ulrich; Robert Trujillo	Metallica	72 Seasons	2023	
"Seek & Destroy"	James Hetfield; Lars Ulrich	Metallica	Kill 'Em All	1983	
"Shadows Follow"	James Hetfield; Lars Ulrich	Metallica	72 Seasons	2023	
"Shoot Me Again"	James Hetfield; Lars Ulrich; Kirk Hammett; Bob Rock ‡	Metallica	St. Anger	2003	
"The Shortest Straw"	James Hetfield; Lars Ulrich	Metallica	...And Justice for All	1988	
"Sleepwalk My Life Away"	James Hetfield; Lars Ulrich; Robert Trujillo	Metallica	72 Seasons	2023	
"Slither"	James Hetfield; Lars Ulrich; Kirk Hammett	Metallica	Reload	1997	
"The Small Hours"	John Mortimer	Holocaust	The $5.98 E.P.: Garage; Days Re-Revisited (Note: "The Small Hours", was also included on Garage Inc.)	1987	
"So What?"	Nick Kulmer; Chris Exall; Clive Blake	Anti-Nowhere League	"The Unforgiven" (Note: "So What?", was also included on the Japanese version of Metallica, and on "Sad but True" and Garage Inc.)	1991	
"Some Kind of Monster" †	James Hetfield; Lars Ulrich; Kirk Hammett; Bob Rock ‡	Metallica	St. Anger	2003	
"Spit Out the Bone" †	James Hetfield; Lars Ulrich	Metallica	Hardwired... to Self-Destruct	2016	
"Stone Cold Crazy"	Freddie Mercury; Brian May; Roger Taylor; John Deacon	Queen	Rubáiyát: Elektra's; 40th Anniversary (Note: "Stone Cold Crazy" was also included on "Enter Sandman" and Garage Inc.)	1990	
"Stone Dead Forever"	Lemmy Kilmister; Eddie Clarke; Phil Taylor	Motörhead	"Hero of the Day" (Note: "Stone Dead Forever" was also included on Garage Inc.)	1996	
"The Struggle Within"	James Hetfield; Lars Ulrich	Metallica	Metallica	1991	
"Suicide & Redemption"	James Hetfield; Lars Ulrich; Kirk Hammett; Robert Trujillo ‡	Metallica	Death Magnetic	2008	
"Sweet Amber"	James Hetfield; Lars Ulrich; Kirk Hammett; Bob Rock ‡	Metallica	St. Anger	2003	
"That Was Just Your Life"	James Hetfield; Lars Ulrich; Kirk Hammett; Robert Trujillo ‡	Metallica	Death Magnetic	2008	
"The Thing That Should Not Be"	James Hetfield; Lars Ulrich; Kirk Hammett	Metallica	Master of Puppets	1986	
"Thorn Within"	James Hetfield; Lars Ulrich; Kirk Hammett	Metallica	Load	1996	
"Through the Never"	James Hetfield; Lars Ulrich; Kirk Hammett	Metallica	Metallica	1991	
"To Live Is to Die"	James Hetfield; Lars Ulrich; Cliff Burton	Metallica	...And Justice for All	1988	
"Today Your Love, Tomorrow the World"	Joey Ramone; Johnny Ramone; Dee Dee Ramone; Tommy Ramone	Ramones	"St. Anger"	2003	
"Too Far Gone?"	James Hetfield; Lars Ulrich	Metallica	72 Seasons	2023	
"Too Late Too Late"	Lemmy Kilmister; Eddie Clarke	Motörhead	"Hero of the Day" (Note: "Too Late Too Late" was also included on Garage Inc.)	1996	
"Trapped Under Ice"	James Hetfield; Lars Ulrich; Kirk Hammett	Metallica	Ride the Lightning	1984	
"Tuesday's Gone"	Ronnie Van Zant; Allen Collins	Lynyrd Skynyrd	Garage Inc.	1998	
"Turn the Page" †	Bob Seger	Bob Seger	Garage Inc.	1998	
"The Unforgiven" †	James Hetfield; Lars Ulrich; Kirk Hammett	Metallica	Metallica	1991	
"The Unforgiven II" †	James Hetfield; Lars Ulrich; Kirk Hammett	Metallica	Reload	1997	
"The Unforgiven III"	James Hetfield; Lars Ulrich; Kirk Hammett; Robert Trujillo ‡	Metallica	Death Magnetic	2008	
"The Unnamed Feeling" †	James Hetfield; Lars Ulrich; Kirk Hammett; Bob Rock ‡	Metallica	St. Anger	2003	
"Until It Sleeps" †	James Hetfield; Lars Ulrich	Metallica	Load	1996	
"The View" † (with Lou Reed)	Lou Reed; James Hetfield; Lars Ulrich; Kirk Hammett; Robert Trujillo ‡	Lou Reed and Metallica	Lulu	2011	
"The Wait"	Jaz Coleman; Geordie Walker; Martin Glover; Paul Ferguson	Killing Joke	The $5.98 E.P.: Garage; Days Re-Revisited (Note: "The Wait" was also included on Garage Inc.)	1987	
"Wasting My Hate"	James Hetfield; Lars Ulrich; Kirk Hammett	Metallica	Load	1996	
"We Did It Again" (Note: "We Did It Again" was also included on Biker Boyz.) (with Swizz Beatz and Ja Rule)	Kasseem Dean; Jeffrey Atkins; James Hetfield; Lars Ulrich; Kirk Hammett	Metallica and Ja Rule	Swizz Beatz Presents; G.H.E.T.T.O. Stories	2002	
"We're a Happy Family"	Joey Ramone; Johnny Ramone; Dee Dee Ramone; Tommy Ramone	Ramones	"St. Anger"	2003	
"Welcome Home (Sanitarium)"	James Hetfield; Lars Ulrich; Kirk Hammett	Metallica	Master of Puppets	1986	
"When a Blind Man Cries"	Ritchie Blackmore; Ian Gillan; Roger Glover; Jon Lord; Ian Paice	Deep Purple	Re-Machined: A Tribute to Deep Purple's Machine Head	2012	
"Where the Wild Things Are"	James Hetfield; Lars Ulrich; Jason Newsted	Metallica	Reload	1997	
"Wherever I May Roam" †	James Hetfield; Lars Ulrich	Metallica	Metallica	1991	
"Whiplash" †	James Hetfield; Lars Ulrich	Metallica	Kill 'Em All	1983	
"Whiskey in the Jar" †	Traditional	Thin Lizzy	Garage Inc.	1998	
"You Must Burn!"	James Hetfield; Lars Ulrich; Robert Trujillo	Metallica	72 Seasons	2023	
"You Really Got Me" (with Ray Davies)	Ray Davies	The Kinks	See My Friends	2010	

== See also ==
- List of Metallica demos
