= Stan Musilek =

Czech-born American photographer (born 1953)

Stan Musilek (born 1953) is an American commercial photographer of Czech origin living and working in San Francisco, California, and Paris, France. He is best known for his fashion and still life photography.

== Biography ==
Born in 1953 in Prague, Musilek relocated to West Germany with his family in 1968, having fled Czechoslovakia following the Soviet invasion. He attended college at the University of Heidelberg, receiving his degree in Mathematics in 1977. Musilek moved to the United States the following year, competing as a midfielder for the University of San Francisco's men's soccer team. He was a member of the team in 1980, when the USF Dons won the Division I NCAA championship. Musilek ultimately received his MFA in Photography from the Academy of Art University in San Francisco in 1982.

== Photographic career ==
Photograph by Stan Musilek for Absolut Vodka's In an Absolut World campaign.

Musilek set up his San Francisco studio in 1984, and his Paris studio in 2001. His advertising work is known in the industry for its sleek contemporary graphic executions as well as for Musilek's ability to meld "the higher end of still-life photography" with "the best of fashion photography." While Musilek has been referred to as a "methodical perfectionist who studies his craft intently", his style has been described as "deliberately contemporary... mixing cutting-edge fashion and design with an old master's skilled hand in lighting and composition." According to one reviewer: "It doesn't really matter what Musilek shoots — watches, cell phones, shoes, cars, fashion models — everything is presented as larger than life, better than real."

Musilek credits much of his success to a mastery of lighting techniques, and to his "embrac[ing] digital technology in the very early stages." In his own words, the "level of visual expectation has risen so much that the idea of the perfect shot is an illusion... We make the perfect moment out of what we collect in materials, from several different shots." Musilek's photographs for Absolut Vodka's In an Absolut World advertising campaign are an example of this practice, "each [photograph] featuring a world that is close to perfect." Thus, "in one of the print ads, New Yorkers finally get their Second Avenue Subway line, thanks to Musilek. In another, he gives cyclists a bike path on the San Francisco Bay Bridge, and for Los Angelinos, he dangles from a helicopter 300 feet above the concrete valley of the festering L.A. River, and — with help from [digital post-production] — turns it into a pollution-free opportunity for water recreation."

His clients have included Absolut, Adidas, Alessi, Apple, Banana Republic, Canon, Coca-Cola, Hanes, La Perla, Logitech, Louis Vuitton Moët Hennessy, Method, Microsoft, Motorola, Neutrogena, Nike, Nokia, Samsung, Sony, Target, The Gap, Thermidor, Toshiba, Verizon, Wolford, Xbox, and Xerox, among others.

Musilek has also photographed well-known celebrities, musicians and athletes, including Dr. Dre, soccer player Abdul Thompson Conteh, basketball star Tracy McGrady, and golfers Sergio García, Justin Rose, Natalie Gulbis, and Paula Creamer. His photographs have appeared in GQ, The New York Times, The New York Times Magazine, and Wired, among other publications.

== Lulu ==
In 2011, Musilek photographed album artwork, including the cover, for Lulu, the musical collaboration between late singer-songwriter Lou Reed and heavy metal band Metallica, based on German playwright Frank Wedekind's early 20th-century Lulu plays. Musilek shot imagery for Lulu's standard CD/vinyl packaging as well as for the limited edition deluxe book set.

Musilek was invited to shoot Lulu by David Turner, Head of Design and Co-founder of San Francisco- and London-based advertising agency, Turner Duckworth. According to Turner, the concept for Lulu's album imagery was the result of collaboration between Musilek and the agency. Musilek is credited for the album's "conceptual" imagery, and photographer Anton Corbijn is credited for the album's photographs of Lulu's band members.

The album imagery and packaging, which won the 2013 Graphis Gold award, depicts a c. 19th-century mannequin bust housed at the Museum der Dinge in Berlin. Some of the album images pair the bust with the nude body of a woman, and many of the images are superimposed with writing, including lyrics from the album, on their surfaces.

Musilek's provocative album imagery was censored by Transport for London, the governing body that manages the city's transport system, from being used as promotional material for Lulu in London Underground stations and trains. The reason for the ban was purportedly because the blood-colored, scribbled writing on the photographs looked too similar to graffiti.

The imagery was also controversial due to its visual content, which featured the bust of an armless, yet lifelike, mannequin. According to The Telegraph's culture critic Lucy Jones, the image depicted violence against women. In her article, which has been since removed from the Telegraph’s website, Jones applauded the censorship of Musilek's photograph, arguing that “[t]aking down a poster that could plant a seed in one person’s head that violence is acceptable is commendable.”

Reed referred to the London Underground ban as “frivolous censorship,” while Metallica's lead singer, James Hetfield, simply stated that “we’re kind of used to things like that.”

Large-scale prints of Musilek's Lulu photographs were exhibited in October 2011 at the Steven Kasher Gallery in New York City, at the album's launch party.

== Awards ==
Musilek has been the recipient of numerous awards over the course of his career, and is one of few photographers to have been selected for the Lürzer's Archive 200 Best Advertising Photographers of the World four years in a row. Other awards include the first place award for Product Photography, the second place award for Fashion Photography, and the third place award for Architecture, in the 2008 Prix de la Photographie, Paris (PX3). Musilek also received a Gold Addy Award in 2007, and a Silver Addy Award in 2009.
