= Beyond Magnetic =

2011 EP by Metallica

EP by Metallica
- Released: December 13, 2011
- Recorded: April 2007 – May 2008
- Studios: Sound City (Los Angeles, California); Shangri-La (Malibu, California); Metallica's HQ (San Rafael, California)
- Genre: Thrash metal
- Length: 29:08
- Label: Warner Bros.
- Producer: Rick Rubin

Metallica chronology
Lulu (2011)	Beyond Magnetic (2011)	Metallica: Through the Never (2013)

Beyond Magnetic is the third extended play by American heavy metal band Metallica. It was initially released on December 13, 2011, on iTunes before being released through other formats later in 2012. It consists of four tracks that were scrapped from the band's ninth studio album Death Magnetic (2008), and were left unfinished before that album's final mixing took place. The EP is predominantly thrash metal, though the tracks range in style.

The release of the EP coincided with the band's 30th anniversary shows at The Fillmore, where one song from the EP would be played live each show before they were made available for download. Critic reviews for Beyond Magnetic ranged from mixed to positive, with critics divided on the quality of the tracks on the EP itself. Several writers felt that the release of the EP was a response to the poor reception towards the band's previous project, Lulu (2011). The EP charted in several territories, reaching number 28 on the Billboard 200 and number 1 on the UK Rock & Metal albums chart.

== Background and release ==
From 2007 to 2008, Metallica worked on their ninth studio album, Death Magnetic, with Rick Rubin serving as the album's producer. Originally, the band recorded 14 songs for Death Magnetic. When it came time for the album's final track list to be decided, the band narrowed it down to 10 songs, with the other 4 being left as rough mixes. The tracks were recorded between April 2007 and May 2008 across three separate recording studios: Sound City Studios in Los Angeles, California; Shangri-La in Malibu, California; and Metallica's HQ in San Rafael, California. Following the release of Death Magnetic and Mission Metallica–a documentary about the record's creation which featured snippets of the scrapped songs, several rumors were spread about them.

Throughout December 2011, Metallica played each of the four songs live for the first time during their 30th anniversary shows at The Fillmore, one each night. (Note: "Hate Train" debuted on December 5, "Just a Bullet Away" on December 7, and "Hell and Back" on December 9.) After each song's live performance, the digital download for it would be sent to members of the band's fan club. On December 13, all four songs were released as part of the Beyond Magnetic extended play, originally being released only through iTunes. It was later released on CD in late January 2012, (Note: Released in the UK on January 27, and in the US on January 31.) and on vinyl on April 21 in celebration of Record Store Day.

== Music ==
Beyond Magnetic is a predominantly thrash metal EP that consists of four tracks: "Hate Train", "Just a Bullet Away", "Hell and Back", and "Rebel of Babylon". Due to the songs being abandoned prior to the final mixing of Death Magnetic, they are far less compressed; a common criticism of Death Magnetic was its production.

"Hate Train" adopts a sound similar to the band's earliest work, though incorporates a groove style similar to what is found on their sixth studio album Load (1996). "Just a Bullet Away" features a style similar to their fifth studio album Metallica (1991), with a writer of Loudwire describing it as "post-Sabbath". "Hell and Back" has been described by Mark Fisher of Metal Forces as Load-sounding alternative rock, as well as a thrash metal epic. "Rebel of Babylon" is an epic that features a sound which Fisher deemed as similar to the Misfits and Danzig.

== Critical reception ==
Professional ratings
Review scores
Source	Rating
AllMusic	4/5 stars
Classic Rock	3.5/5 stars
Consequence of Sound	2/5 stars
Entertainment Weekly	B+
Metal Forces	6/10
Rolling Stone	3.5/5 stars

Kyle Anderson of Entertainment Weekly described the songs on Beyond Magnetic as a series of "classically punishing hair-whippers" that reminded the world of Metallica's "commitment to the art of the shred". Stephen Thomas Erlewine, writing for AllMusic, said that the EP was an "acknowledgment of the band's core strengths". He felt that any of the songs could have easily been part of Death Magnetic without hindering the album's quality, yet remained as a "potent shot of old-fashioned thrash" when viewed independently. Contrarily, Alex Young of Consequence of Sound believed that the songs on Beyond Magnetic were left behind for good reason, and that when combined with "uneven mix quality or blatant defects", it created an EP of "listless, pointless neutrality on a moving train".

Malcom Dome of Classic Rock wrote that the songs on Beyond Magnetic were "far more" than scrapped songs, believing that each song's "energy and thrust" had not been tampered with in contrast to those that made it onto Death Magnetic, which he viewed as an album with "too much mixing". He further described Beyond Magnetic as grimy, bare, and "the way Metallica should record their next album". Fisher echoed similar thoughts, believing that the unfinished production of the songs elevated their quality.

Fisher felt that, while the release of the tracks was likely in the works for some time and would help satisfy fans until the release of Metallica's next studio album, none of the songs would leave listeners wondering why they did not make Death Magnetic, and that the release seemed "an awful lot like damage control" from the reception towards the band's previous release, Lulu (2011). Echoing similar thoughts were Anderson and Young. The former interpreted the release of the EP as an apology for Lulu, while the latter described it as an EP "released to a public feeling drowsy from side effects associated with Lou Reed".

== Commercial performance ==
In the United States, Beyond Magnetic reached number 29 on the Billboard 200. Meanwhile, it also reached number 2 on Top Hard Rock Albums, number 5 on Top Alternative Albums, and number 6 on Top Rock Albums. On the 2012 year end charts for the Top Rock Albums, Beyond Magnetic placed at number 54. In the United Kingdom, it reached number 1 on the Rock Albums Chart and number 13 on the Album Downloads Chart. Elsewhere, Beyond Magnetic reached number 8 and 56 on the South Korean International Albums chart and the South Korean Albums chart, respectively, number 12 in Hungary, number 19 in Australia, number 22 in Germany and New Zealand, number 29 in Canada, and number 50 in Japan.

== Track listing ==
All lyrics are written by James Hetfield; all music is composed by Hetfield, Lars Ulrich, Kirk Hammett, and Robert Trujillo.

Beyond Magnetic track listing
No.	Title	Length
1.	"Hate Train"	6:59
2.	"Just a Bullet Away"	7:11
3.	"Hell and Back"	6:57
4.	"Rebel of Babylon"	8:02
Total length:		29:09

== Personnel ==
Writing, performance and production credits are adapted from the album's liner notes.

Metallica

- James Hetfield – vocals, rhythm guitar, lead guitar on "Just a Bullet Away"
- Kirk Hammett – lead guitar, rhythm guitar on "Just a Bullet Away"
- Robert Trujillo – bass guitar
- Lars Ulrich – drums

Production

- Rick Rubin – production
- Greg Fidelman – recording
- Mike Gillies – recording
- Sara Lyn Killion – recording assistant
- Joshua Smith – recording assistant
- Adam Fuller – recording assistant
- Vlado Meller – mastering

Artwork and design

- Anton Corbijn – photography

== Charts ==
=== Weekly charts ===
Chart performance for Beyond Magnetic
Chart (2011)	Peak position
Australian Albums (ARIA)	19
Canadian Albums (Billboard)	29
German Albums (Offizielle Top 100)	22
Hungarian Albums (MAHASZ)	12
Japanese Albums (Oricon)	50
New Zealand Albums (RMNZ)	22
Scottish Albums (Official Charts)	23
South Korean Albums (Circle)	44
South Korean International Albums (Circle)	8
UK Album Downloads (Official Charts)	13
UK Rock & Metal Albums (Official Charts)	1
US Billboard 200	29
US Top Alternative Albums (Billboard)	5
US Top Hard Rock Albums (Billboard)	2
US Top Rock Albums (Billboard)	6
US Indie Store Album Sales (Billboard)	6

=== Year-end charts ===
Chart performance for Beyond Magnetic
Chart (2012)	Position
US Top Rock Albums (Billboard)	54
