= The View (song) =

2011 single by Lou Reed and Metallica

Single by Lou Reed and Metallica

from the album Lulu
- Released: September 26, 2011
- Recorded: 2011
- Studio: Metallica's HQ (San Rafael, California)
- Genre: Alternative metal
- Length: 5:15
- Label: Warner Bros.
- Composers: Lou Reed; James Hetfield; Lars Ulrich; Kirk Hammett; Robert Trujillo
- Lyricist: Lou Reed
- Producers: Greg Fidelman; Metallica; Lou Reed; Hal Willner

Lou Reed singles chronology
"Gravity/Safety Zone" (2007)	"The View" (2011)

Metallica singles chronology
"Broken, Beat & Scarred" (2009)	"The View" (2011)	"Lords of Summer" (2014)

Music video
- "The View" on YouTube

"The View" is a song by American rock musician Lou Reed and heavy metal band Metallica, from their collaborative album Lulu (2011). It was released as the album's lead and only single on September 26, 2011, through Warner Bros. Records. A five-minute long alternative metal song, it features vocals from both Reed and Metallica's James Hetfield. Metallica and Reed produced the song with Greg Fidelman and Hal Willner.

"The View" was met with a negative response upon its release. Critics panned the track, with some reviewers questioning the merit of the collaboration from the track. Internet audiences were overwhelmingly negative towards the song, with the song's music video amassing a large amount of dislikes within a few days of release. One of Hetfield's lines in the song, "I am the table", later became an internet meme with imagery depicting Hetfield as a table.

== Background and release ==
Lulu is a collaboration between Lou Reed and Metallica. The project came about after the two met during the Rock and Roll Hall of Fame's 25th anniversary ceremony in October 2009, where together they played two songs by one of Reed's previous bands, the Velvet Underground. After the performance, Reed suggested the idea of creating a record together to Metallica's drummer Lars Ulrich. Prior to the conception of the album Lulu, Reed composed the music for Robert Wilson's staging of the play Lulu. The play centers around a sexually uninhibited young woman who ends up in multiple cities across Europe, and is ultimately murdered by Jack the Ripper. When Reed and Metallica met up to plan out their collaboration, Reed suggested that they adapt Lulu.

Recording and production took place from April to June 2011. "The View" was recorded in a single live take, with only a few rehearsals being done prior to this take. Guitarist Kirk Hammett said that he thought the recording was supposed to only be a jam session rather than the final take, and that he and the rest of Metallica were surprised when Reed said it would be the final version, although Hammett felt that it worked out for the song. The song was produced by Metallica, Reed, Greg Fidelman, and Hal Willner. Reed is the song's sole lyricist.

Prior to the album's release, "The View" was released as its only single on September 26, 2011. The album's music video for the song was directed by Darren Aronofsky. The song was played during the album's promotional concerts. Lulu was released on November 1; The View" is the album's second song.

== Composition and lyrics ==
"The View"
A 29-second sample to "The View" featuring Lou Reed's spoken word delivered over a repeated riff.

"The View" is an alternative metal song that is 5 minutes and 15 seconds long. David Fricke of Rolling Stone described the song having a "crippled-march rhythm" and "smeared-blues guitar outbursts". The song also features an abrupt shift into double-time rhythm. While of the song repeats the same guitar riff, it is also the only song on Lulu that contains a guitar solo, which was only done after Hammett encouraged Reed to allow a solo for "The View" specifically. "The View" goes between vocals from both Reed and Metallica's James Hetfield. Reed's vocals are delivered in the form of a spoken word monolog over the main riff, while Hetfield's vocal delivery is more emotional and gritty.

While Marc Hogan of Spin suggested that some of the song's lyrics discuss sex and death, other journalists found parts of the song to be unintelligible, particularly Hetfield's portion. At one point in the song, Hetfield calls himself a table, alongside various other things ("I am the view, I am the table, I am all this" / "I am the root, the progress, the aggressor!" / "I am the table, I am the ten stories, I am the table"). The "table" lyric became an internet meme after the song's release, with imagery depicting Hetfield as a table, including mock IKEA advertisements, and vandalism to Hetfield's article on the English Wikipedia, where his profession was temporarily listed as being a table.

== Critical reception ==
"The View" was generally negatively received. Spencer Kaufman of Loudwire called "The View" a song that could alienate both fans of Metallica and Reed, believing the instrumental would be too heavy for a typical Reed fan, and Reed's vocals might not appeal to a typical metal fan. Ultimate Classic Rock's Matthew Wilkening questioned whether the song, as the first demonstration of the collaboration, demonstrated any aspects that were improved by combining the two's sounds. He criticized Reed's vocals, calling them dry and pretentious, and feeling as if the song's mix was designed to have his vocals drown out Metallica's performance. Meanwhile, he also criticized Hetfield's part as having lyrics that don't make sense. Stuart Berman of Pitchfork said that Hetfield's performance on "The View" sounded like a self-parody.

In contrast, David Fricke of Rolling Stone viewed the song positively, calling the combination of Metallica's instrumentals with Reed's vocals as akin to doom metal. Edward Clibbens of DIY wrote that, after getting adjusted to Reed's spoken word vocals, "The View" was "in a strange way a likeable track", highlighting Metallica's instrumental and Hammett's solo. In 2015, the editorial team for Spin ranked "The View" as Metallica's 32nd best song, calling it a song that should've been "unlistenable", but instead was "compulsively re-listenable". They further wrote that "few songs by anyone this century have been this fascinating".

Internet audiences responded to the release of "The View" with overwhelming backlash, including a large amount of dislikes to the song's music video. Only three days after the song's release, The New Zealand Herald reported that it had twice as many dislikes as likes on YouTube, and noted several negative social media comments made towards the song, such as those calling it a "trainwreck". Pitchfork noted that some internet users, from previews of "The View" alone, already resorted to calling Lulu one of the worst albums ever made.

== Personnel ==
Adapted from the song's digital liner notes.

- Lou Reed – lead vocals, Continuum
- James Hetfield – vocals, rhythm guitar
- Kirk Hammett – lead guitar
- Robert Trujillo – bass
- Lars Ulrich – drums
