= Lulu (Lou Reed and Metallica album) =

Studio album by Lou Reed and Metallica
- Released: October 31, 2011
- Recorded: April–June 2011
- Studio: Metallica's HQ (San Rafael)
- Genres: Avant-garde metal; spoken word
- Length: 87:05
- Labels: Warner Bros.; Vertigo
- Producers: Greg Fidelman; Metallica; Lou Reed; Hal Willner

Lou Reed chronology
The Creation of the Universe (2008)	Lulu (2011)

Metallica chronology
Live at Grimey's (2010)	Lulu (2011)	Beyond Magnetic (2011)

Singles from Lulu
- 1. "The View" Released: September 27, 2011

Lulu is a collaborative studio album by the American rock singer-songwriter Lou Reed and the American thrash metal band Metallica, released on October 31, 2011, through Warner Bros. Records in the United States and Vertigo Records elsewhere. The album is the final full-length studio recording project that Reed was involved in before his death in October 2013. It was recorded in San Rafael, California, from April to June 2011. The lead single, titled "The View", was released on September 27, 2011.

Lulu is a double album and a concept album based on the two "Lulu" plays by the German playwright Frank Wedekind (1864–1918). The music largely consists of spoken word poetry by Reed over music by Metallica, with occasional backing vocals by Metallica frontman James Hetfield. Upon its release, Lulu received polarized reviews, and an extremely negative response from many fans of both artists and several prominent critics. As of May 2025, Lulu has sold 280,000 copies worldwide.

== Background ==
Lou Reed and Metallica had both been on the bill in October 1997 for the eleventh of Neil Young's annual Bridge School Benefit concerts. After both artists performed together at the Rock and Roll Hall of Fame's 25th Anniversary Concert, they began "kicking around the idea of making a record together," but did not start working together until two years later. In February 2011, Metallica guitarist Kirk Hammett announced that the group would start working on something "not 100 percent a Metallica record" that May. This was revealed to be a collaboration with Reed that June, following the completion of recording.

The artists' collaboration was originally intended to be Metallica re-recording various previously unreleased songs by Reed. Among these demos was a collection of songs composed for a play called Lulu—a theatrical production of the German playwright Frank Wedekind's plays Earth Spirit and Pandora's Box. Reed shared these songs with Metallica to help bring the "piece to the next level," and the group provided "significant arrangement contributions" to the material. David Fricke of Rolling Stone heard at least two of the songs from the project in June 2011—"Pumping Blood" and "Mistress Dread"—and described their sound as a "raging union of [Reed's] 1973 noir classic, Berlin, and Metallica's '86 crusher, Master of Puppets." Reed stated that "Everything is cut live – us staring at each other, playing". Tempers flared a few times during the recording sessions, with Metallica drummer Lars Ulrich admitting that at one point Reed had challenged him to a "street fight".

All tracks were made available for listening on the official Lou Reed and Metallica website before the album's release.

== Singles ==
"The View"
A 29-second sample to "The View" featuring Lou Reed's spoken word delivered over a repeated riff.

Lead single "The View" was released for streaming online in late September 2011. Examining reaction to the track and a previously released 30-second preview of the same, The New Zealand Herald reported that there was much negative reaction by fans online, and that the song had about twice as many dislikes as likes on YouTube. Not all reaction to the song was negative; Rolling Stone gave "The View" a 4 out of 5 star rating while the same song was rated 4.5 out of 5 by Artist Direct and positively by One Thirty BPM. The song's music video was directed by Darren Aronofsky, with cinematography by Matthew Libatique and produced by Scott Franklin through Protozoa Pictures, his and Aronofsky's production company. Originally, it was planned that Aronofsky should helm a performance video for "Iced Honey" but "when everyone got together, it became obvious 'The View' was the way to go."

== Reception ==
Professional ratings
Aggregate scores
Source	Rating
AnyDecentMusic?	4.1/10
Metacritic	45/100
Review scores
Source	Rating
AllMusic	3/5 stars
Consequence of Sound	F
The Daily Telegraph	3/5 stars
Drowned in Sound	10/10
Entertainment Weekly	D
The Guardian	2/5 stars
NME	7/10
Pitchfork	1.0/10
Rolling Stone	3/5 stars
Spin	6/10

Lulu received polarized reviews from critics. At Metacritic, which assigns a normalized rating out of 100 to reviews from mainstream critics, Lulu received an average score of 45, based on 31 reviews. Staff reviewer Joseph Viney of Sputnikmusic rated it one and a half out of five and commented: "The fallout from this could have dire consequences. A lot of people, already placing Metallica at the best seat in the house at the Last Chance Saloon have now called last orders. It's genuinely difficult to guess what their next move will be. As for Reed, his legacy, whatever that means in his case, is cemented and this will have no real effect on him."

Pitchfork critic Stuart Berman assigned the album a 1.0 rating, writing: "for all the hilarity that ought to ensue here, Lulu is a frustratingly noble failure. Audacious to the extreme, but exhaustingly tedious as a result, its few interesting ideas are stretched out beyond the point of utility and pounded into submission." Essayist and pop culture writer Chuck Klosterman, in his review for the website Grantland, wrote, "If the Red Hot Chili Peppers acoustically covered the 12 worst Primus songs for Starbucks, it would still be (slightly) better than this." Julian Marszalek of The Quietus described the album as "Lou Reed ranting over some Metallica demos that were never intended for human consumption," suggesting that time spent listening to Lulu could have been better spent watching grass grow "or perhaps wanking into a sock." Don Kaye, who had previously defended Metallica's much-maligned 2003 album St. Anger, wrote on Blabbermouth.net that "Lulu is a catastrophic failure on almost every level, a project that could quite possibly do irreparable harm to Metallica's career."

In contrast, J. R. Moores of Drowned in Sound gave the album a perfect score of 10 out of 10 and praised it as "the second greatest record ever made in the history of the human ear drum" after Reed's Metal Machine Music. The review was commonly understood to be a joke, which the writer denied. In a review titled "Metallica and Lou Reed's 'Lulu' Is Actually Excellent", James Parker of The Atlantic wrote: "I don't think the record is crap. In fact I love it... Give Lulu a shot. Give it another listen. Offer it what Lou would call your 'coagulating heart,' and you will be rewarded." In The Wire, David Keenan wrote that "Metallica's unrelenting sledgehammer style works as the perfect complement to Reed's vision of compassionless love" and concluded "[a]gainst all the odds, Lulu functions as the ultimate realisation of Reed's aesthetic of Metal Machine Music, cruel vulgar, half in love with power and pain but with a bruised, beating heart at its centre." Uncut gave the record a positive review, singling out the closer "Junior Dad" for praise as the "perfect ending to the most extraordinary, passionate and just plain brilliant record either participant has made for a long while." NME, scoring the record seven out of ten, praised it as "a surprising triumph", and said that the offering's "breadth and ambition is to be applauded. Metallica have performed way beyond what many thought them capable; they improvise freely as Reed's musical bitch, while for him this marks his most outré offering since Metal Machine Music". The Telegraph awarded Lulu three stars out of five, stating that while it was "gruelling, even by latter Lou Reed standards," the sense of "unrestrained folly" and sheer lack of commercialism made the album feel "important".

Additional praise was received for the album when Lulu reached number nine on The Wire's year-end critics' poll. The Wire's Jennifer Lucy Allan commented: "ultimately, the reaction to it is a testament to Lou Reed's ability to still get up the noses and under the skin of even the most open-minded listeners. He's probably laughing his head off at it all this very minute." Mattin wrote that "Lulu is more Lou Reed than Lou Reed and that surely means that this is the best thing ever done by anybody."

In a piece published on the day of Reed's death, Robert Christgau wrote that Lulu "probably didn't get enough" praise from critics.

At Reed's 2015 posthumous induction into the Rock and Roll Hall of Fame, Reed's widow Laurie Anderson announced that David Bowie had referred to Lulu as Reed's "greatest work". LCD Soundsystem's James Murphy later said Bowie had told him Lulu was "some of the best writing Lou's done. People are making a snap judgment and they aren't listening."

=== Response to criticism ===
Reed claimed that Metallica fans threatened to shoot him in response to Lulu. In response to the album's reception, he commented: "I don't have any fans left. After Metal Machine Music, they all fled. Who cares? I'm essentially in this for the fun of it." Ulrich also noted the negative reaction to Lulu, contending that the band was used to this: "In 1984, when hard-core Metallica fans heard acoustic guitars on 'Fade to Black', there was a nuclear meltdown in the heavy-metal community." He admitted that Reed's lyrics were "not for everyone." Hetfield described many of the album's detractors as "fearful people who are probably typing from their mom’s basement that they still live in. They’re afraid to move on or to experience life...But like Lars says, we’re artists and we have to spread our wings. How do you know you’re not supposed to go somewhere until you go there?" Reed further stated that the album was for "literate people". Metallica bassist Robert Trujillo opined: "Love it or hate it, it was definitely something that we enjoyed and that we embraced."

Following Reed's death, Ulrich wrote in The Guardian:

I played the record for my kids yesterday in the car, and it sounded as relevant and more intense than ever; it sounded incredibly potent, very alive and impulsive ... Twenty-five years from now, you're going to have millions of people claiming they owned the record or loved it when it came out, of course neither will be true. I think it's going to age well—when I played it yesterday it sounded fucking awesome. In some ways it's almost cooler that people didn't embrace it, because it makes it more ours, it's our project, our record, and this was never made for the masses and the masses didn't take to it. It makes it more precious for those who were involved.

== Commercial performance ==
In the United States, the album debuted at number 36 on the Billboard 200 with first-week sales of 13,000 copies. This made it Reed's highest-charting release since Sally Can't Dance, which reached number 10 in 1974. Lulu debuted in the top 10 of the charts in eight countries. Despite this, sales fell off drastically; three years after its release, the album had sold just under 33,000 copies in the US, well below the average sales of both Metallica and Lou Reed. As of May 2025, Lulu has sold 280,000 copies worldwide.

== Track listing ==
All lyrics are written by Lou Reed; all music is composed by Reed and Metallica.

Disc one
No.	Title	Length
1.	"Brandenburg Gate"	4:20
2.	"The View"	5:15
3.	"Pumping Blood"	7:25
4.	"Mistress Dread"	6:50
5.	"Iced Honey"	4:35
6.	"Cheat on Me"	11:25
Total length:		39:50

Disc two
No.	Title	Length
7.	"Frustration"	8:35
8.	"Little Dog"	8:00
9.	"Dragon"	11:10
10.	"Junior Dad"	19:30
Total length:		47:15

== Personnel ==
Personnel taken from Lulu liner notes.

Musicians

- Lou Reed – guitars, Continuum, vocals
- James Hetfield – guitars, vocals
- Lars Ulrich – drums
- Kirk Hammett – guitars
- Robert Trujillo – bass guitar

Additional musicians

- Sarth Calhoun – electronics
- Jenny Scheinman – violin, viola, string arrangements
- Megan Gould – violin
- Ron Lawrence – viola
- Marika Hughes – cello
- Ulrich Maiss – cello on "Frustration" and "Little Dog"
- Rob Wasserman – electric upright bass on "Junior Dad"
- Jessica Troy – viola on "Junior Dad"

Production and design

- Lou Reed – production
- Metallica – production
- Hal Willner – production
- Greg Fidelman – production, engineering, mixing
- Mike Gillies – engineering
- Jim Monti – additional engineering
- Dan Monti – additional engineering
- Sara Lyn Killion – additional engineering
- Kent Matcke – additional engineering
- Geoff Neal – mix assistance
- Anton Corbijn – photographs for album packaging
- Stan Musilek – photographs for album cover and packaging
- Vlado Meller – mastering at Masterdisk NYC

== Charts ==
Chart (2011)	Peak position
Australian Albums Chart	33
Austrian Albums Chart	11
Belgian Albums Chart (Flanders)	17
Belgian Albums Chart (Wallonia)	14
Canadian Albums Chart	26
Croatian Albums Chart	4
Czech Albums Chart	4
Danish Albums Chart	13
Dutch Albums Chart	17
Finnish Albums Chart	16
Irish Albums Chart	36
Italy Albums Chart	9
Japanese Albums Chart	14
New Zealand Albums Chart	12
Norwegian Albums Chart	11
Polish Albums Chart	6
Portuguese Albums Chart	8
Russian Albums Chart	10
Spanish Albums Chart	12
Swedish Albums Chart	9
Swiss Albums Chart	14
UK Albums Chart	36
US Billboard 200	36
