= List of UK Rock & Metal Singles Chart number ones of 1998 =

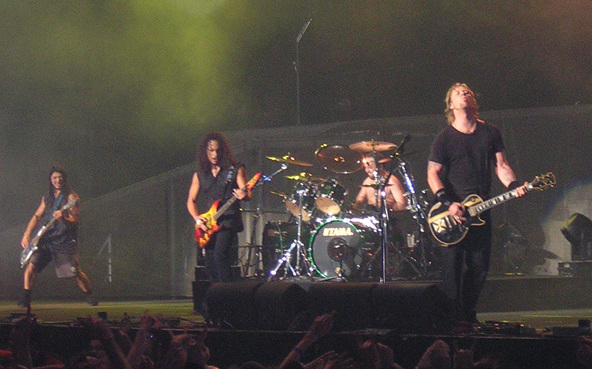
"The Unforgiven II" by Metallica was the longest-running number-one single of 1998, spending ten weeks atop the chart. The band also spent five weeks at number one with "The Memory Remains".

The UK Rock & Metal Singles Chart is a record chart which ranks the best-selling rock and heavy metal songs in the United Kingdom. Compiled and published by the Official Charts Company, the data is based on each track's weekly physical sales, digital downloads and streams. In 1998, there were 12 singles that topped the 52 published charts. The first number-one single of the year was "The Memory Remains" by American heavy metal band Metallica, which spent the first four weeks of the year at number one. The final number one of the year was Resurrection, an extended play by American industrial metal band Fear Factory.

The most successful song on the UK Rock & Metal Singles Chart in 1998 was "The Unforgiven II" by Metallica, which spent a total of ten weeks at number one during the year. The band also spent five weeks at number one with "The Memory Remains". "Lonely, Cryin', Only" by Therapy? and "Pressure On" by Roger Taylor spent six weeks each at number one; Sonic Youth's "Sunday" spent five weeks at number one; Marilyn Manson's Remix & Repent and Whale's "Crying at Airports" were both number one for four weeks; "November Rain" by Guns N' Roses and "Choke" by Sepultura spent three weeks each at number one; and "Mungo City" by Spacehog, "Wishlist" by Pearl Jam and Resurrection by Fear Factory spent two weeks each at number one on the UK Rock & Metal Singles Chart during 1998.

== Chart history ==
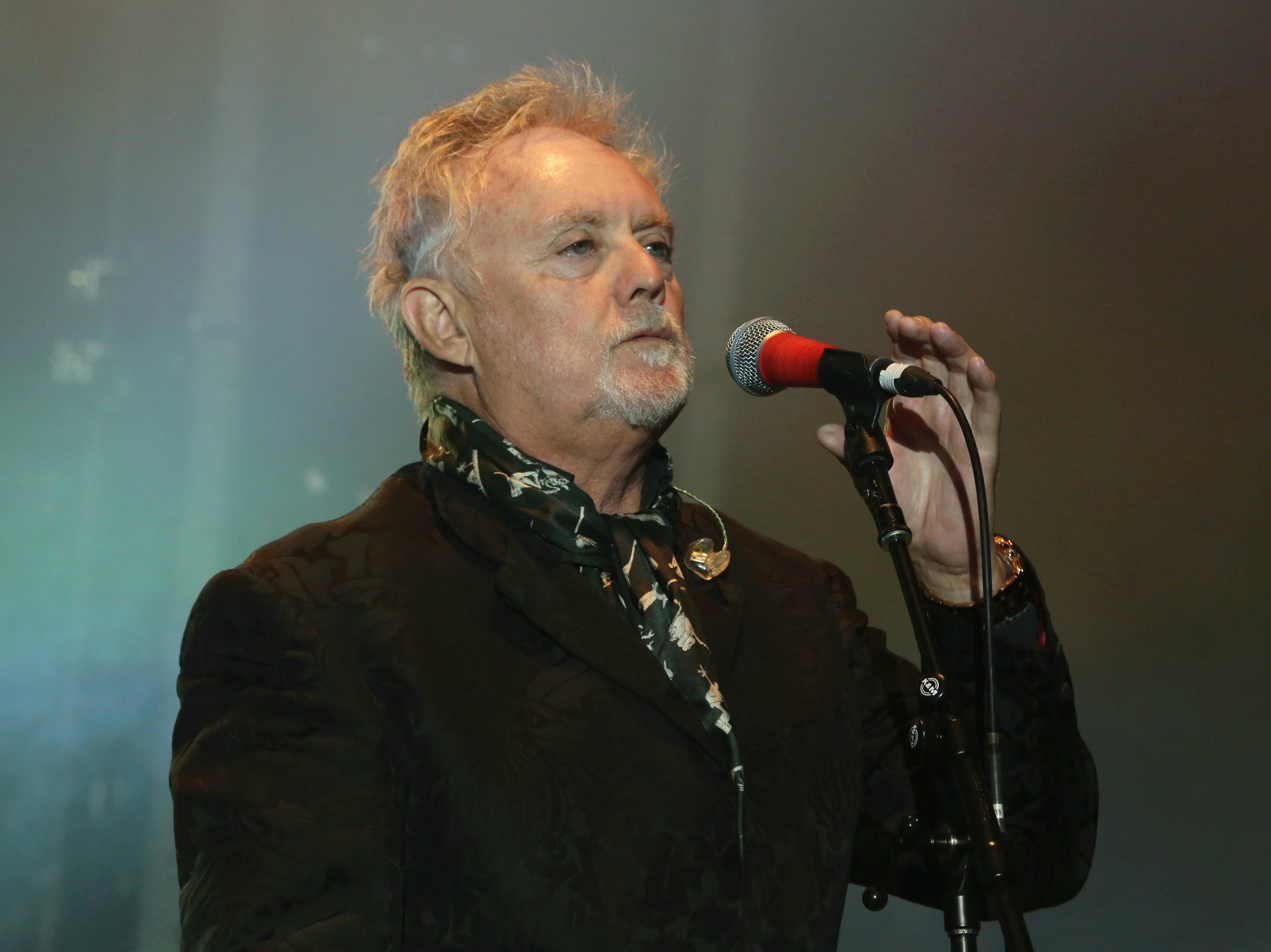
Drummer Roger Taylor topped the chart for six weeks with "Pressure On".

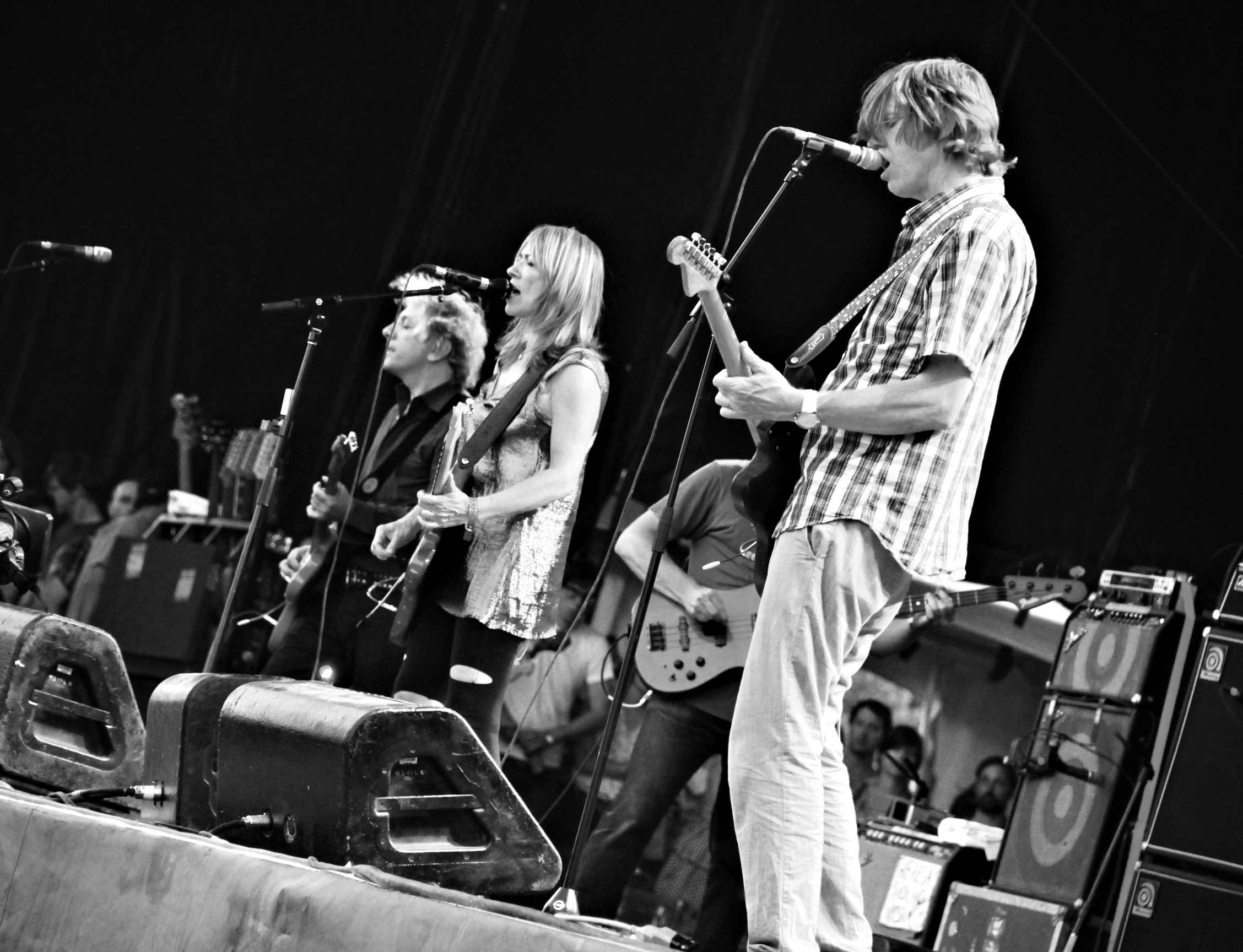
"Sunday" by Sonic Youth was number one for five weeks during 1998.

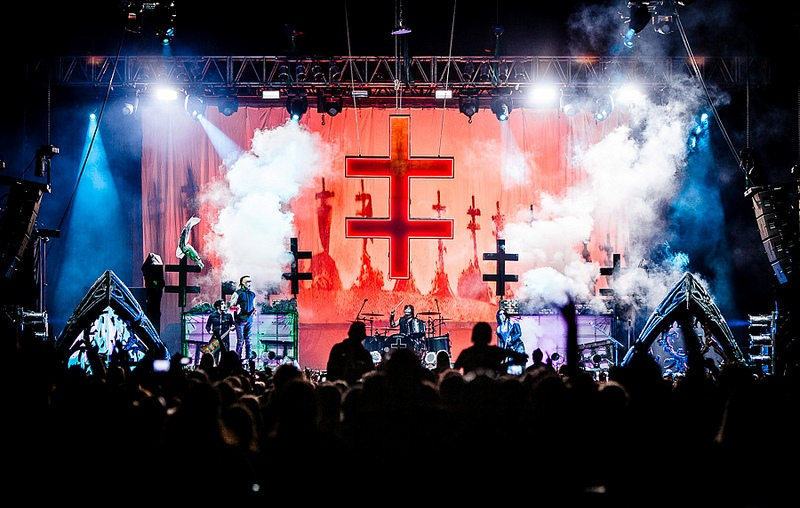
Marilyn Manson's Remix & Repent EP spent four weeks at number one.

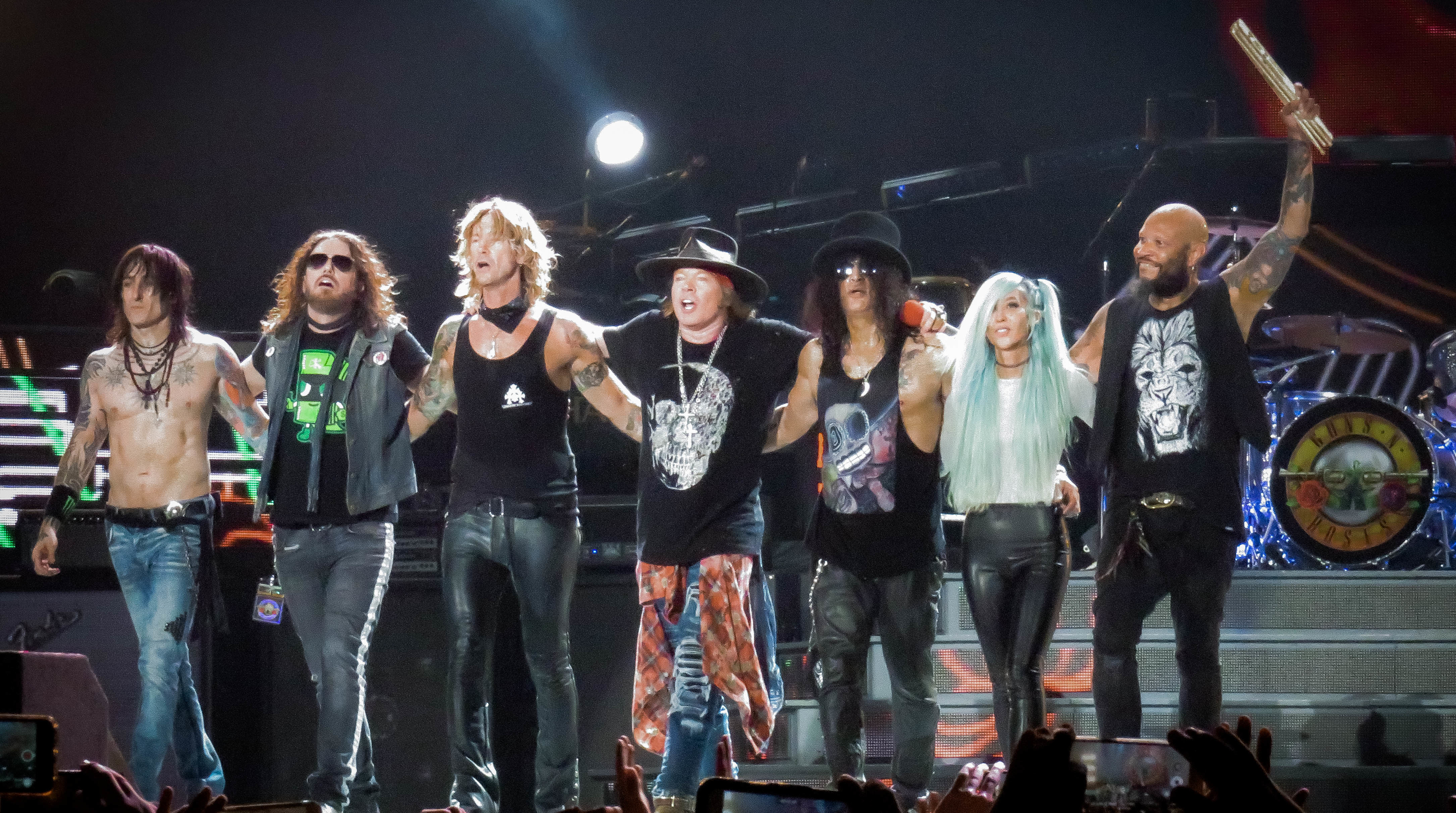
"November Rain" by Guns N' Roses was number one for three weeks.

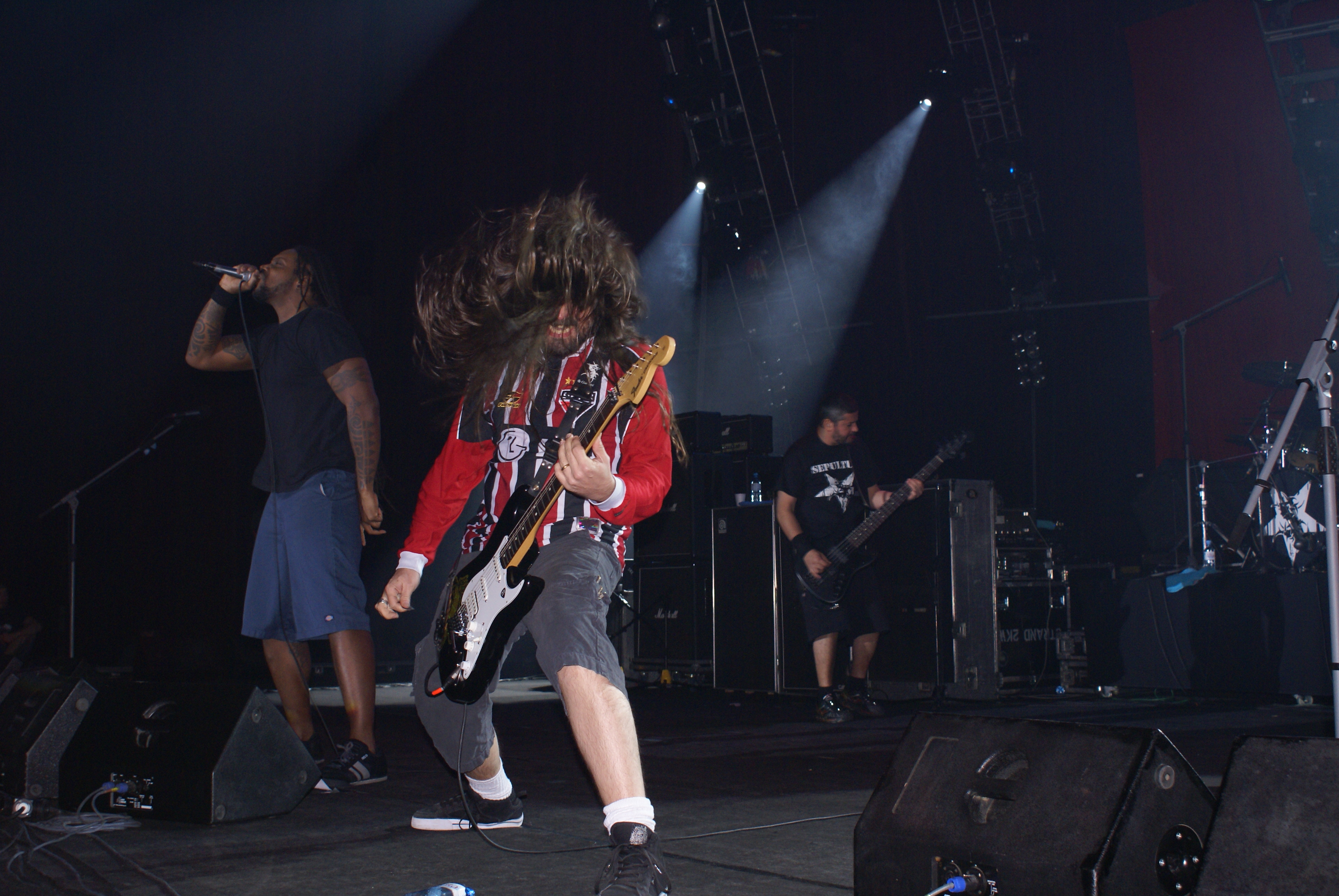
Sepultura's "Choke" spent three weeks at number one during 1998.

Issue date	Single	Artist(s)	Record label(s)	Ref.
3 January	"The Memory Remains"	Metallica	Vertigo	
10 January	"The Memory Remains"	Metallica	Vertigo	
17 January	"The Memory Remains"	Metallica	Vertigo	
24 January	"The Memory Remains"	Metallica	Vertigo	
31 January	"Remix & Repent"	Marilyn Manson	Interscope	
7 February	"Remix & Repent"	Marilyn Manson	Interscope	
14 February	"Remix & Repent"	Marilyn Manson	Interscope	
21 February	"The Memory Remains"	Metallica	Vertigo	
28 February	"Remix & Repent"	Marilyn Manson	Vertigo	
7 March	"The Unforgiven II"	Metallica	Vertigo	
14 March	"The Unforgiven II"	Metallica	Vertigo	
21 March	"The Unforgiven II"	Metallica	Vertigo	
28 March	"The Unforgiven II"	Metallica	Vertigo	
4 April	"The Unforgiven II"	Metallica	Vertigo	
11 April	"The Unforgiven II"	Metallica	Vertigo	
18 April	"The Unforgiven II"	Metallica	Vertigo	
25 April	"The Unforgiven II"	Metallica	Vertigo	
2 May	"Mungo City"	Spacehog	Sire	
9 May	"Mungo City"	Spacehog	Sire	
16 May	"The Unforgiven II"	Metallica	Vertigo	
23 May	"Wishlist"	Pearl Jam	Epic	
30 May	"Lonely, Cryin', Only"	Therapy?	A&M	
6 June	"Lonely, Cryin', Only"	Therapy?	A&M	
13 June	"Lonely, Cryin', Only"	Therapy?	A&M	
20 June	"Lonely, Cryin', Only"	Therapy?	A&M	
27 June	"Lonely, Cryin', Only"	Therapy?	A&M	
4 July	"Lonely, Cryin', Only"	Therapy?	A&M	
11 July	"Sunday"	Sonic Youth	Geffen	
18 July	"Sunday"	Sonic Youth	Geffen	
25 July	"Sunday"	Sonic Youth	Geffen	
1 August	"Sunday"	Sonic Youth	Geffen	
8 August	"Sunday"	Sonic Youth	Geffen	
15 August	"Wishlist"	Pearl Jam	Epic	
22 August	"The Unforgiven II"	Metallica	Vertigo	
29 August	"Crying at Airports"	Whale	Hut	
5 September	"Crying at Airports"	Whale	Hut	
12 September	"Crying at Airports"	Whale	Hut	
19 September	"Crying at Airports"	Whale	Hut	
26 September	"November Rain"	Guns N' Roses	Geffen	
3 October	"November Rain"	Guns N' Roses	Geffen	
10 October	"Pressure On"	Roger Taylor	Parlophone	
17 October	"Pressure On"	Roger Taylor	Parlophone	
24 October	"Pressure On"	Roger Taylor	Parlophone	
31 October	"Pressure On"	Roger Taylor	Parlophone	
7 November	"Pressure On"	Roger Taylor	Parlophone	
14 November	"Pressure On"	Roger Taylor	Parlophone	
21 November	"November Rain"	Guns N' Roses	Geffen	
28 November	"Choke"	Sepultura	Roadrunner	
5 December	"Choke"	Sepultura	Roadrunner	
12 December	"Choke"	Sepultura	Roadrunner	
19 December	"Resurrection"	Fear Factory	Roadrunner	
26 December	"Resurrection"	Fear Factory	Roadrunner	

== See also ==
- 1998 in British music
- List of UK Rock & Metal Albums Chart number ones of 1998
