= Better than You =

Better than You may refer to:

- "Better than You" (Metallica song), 1998
- "Better than You" (Kate Alexa song), 2006
- "Better than You" (Conor Maynard song), 2012
- Better than You (mixtape), a 2022 mixtape by DaBaby and YoungBoy Never Broke Again
- "Better than You", a song by Cardi B featuring Cash Cobain from Am I the Drama?
- "Better than You", a song by Swans from White Light from the Mouth of Infinity
- "Better than You", a song by Lisa Keith
