= Reload (Metallica album) =

Studio album by Metallica
- Released: November 18, 1997
- Recorded: May 1995 – February 1996; July–October 1997
- Studio: The Plant (Sausalito, California)
- Genres: Hard rock; heavy metal
- Length: 76:03
- Labels: Elektra; Vertigo
- Producers: Bob Rock; James Hetfield; Lars Ulrich

Metallica chronology
Load (1996)	Reload (1997)	Garage Inc. (1998)

Singles from Reload
- 1. "The Memory Remains" Released: November 10, 1997; 2. "The Unforgiven II" Released: February 23, 1998; 3. "Fuel" Released: June 22, 1998

Reload (stylized as ReLoad) is the seventh studio album by American heavy metal band Metallica, released on November 18, 1997, through Elektra Records in the United States and Vertigo Records internationally. The follow-up to Load (1996), the album was recorded during the same sessions as that album with producer Bob Rock. While a double album was considered, the band decided to split the material into two albums. Additional sessions for Reload took place in 1997 after Load's supporting tour. Reload was Metallica's first studio album to feature a guest singer (Marianne Faithfull on "The Memory Remains") and the last studio album to feature bassist Jason Newsted.

Like its predecessor, Reload features a hard rock sound that strayed away from Metallica's thrash metal roots. The band members' influences at the time led to experimentations in styles such as blues, country, alternative rock, and grunge, and the use of instruments such as hurdy-gurdy and violin on "Low Man's Lyric". The album also features "The Unforgiven II", a sequel to 1991's "The Unforgiven". Lead singer James Hetfield's lyrics were inspired by his tormented childhood, with themes of anger and aggression present on multiple tracks. The cover artwork, like Load, is a painting by Andres Serrano, created by mixing blood and urine.

Released 17 months after Load, Reload was a commercial success, topping the charts in seven countries and debuting at number one on the US Billboard 200. It was accompanied by three singles: "The Memory Remains", "The Unforgiven II", and "Fuel". The band supported the album on the Poor Re-Touring Me tour (1998). Reload received mixed reviews from music critics; some praised the band's performances while others criticized it for a lack of innovation. Retrospective reviewers generally describe Reload as overlong and believe it and Load could have been condensed into a single album. A super deluxe reissue was released in June 2026.

== Background and recording ==
I know a lot of people think [Reload is] just the scraps – but it's not. We normally stop at 12 songs when we write albums, but we knew we wanted to develop all of them, that they were all good enough.

— Lars Ulrich, 1997

Reload was recorded during the same sessions as Metallica's previous album, Load, at The Plant Studios in Sausalito, California, between May 1995 and February 1996. The sessions were produced by Bob Rock, who also produced Load and Metallica (1991). The original idea was to release Load and Reload as a double album, but problems arose with recording almost 30 songs at one time, so Metallica decided to separate the material into two different albums. Lead singer and rhythm guitarist James Hetfield said at the time: "Reload has all of the crappy ones [laughs] ... But really, these aren't the rejects, they're just all the songs that weren't finished when we released Load." Lead guitarist Kirk Hammett also believed a double album "would have been a lot more material for people to digest, and some of it might have gotten lost in the shuffle".

By 1994, the band members' influences extended beyond heavy metal: Hetfield took inspiration from songwriters such as Leonard Cohen, Tom Waits, and Nick Cave; Hammett grew interested in David Bowie's works with Robert Fripp and Adrian Belew, and the blues music of Muddy Waters, Buddy Guy, and Howlin' Wolf; Newsted grew fond of Red Hot Chili Peppers and Faith No More, particularly the bass playing of the former's Flea; and Ulrich was enjoying Britpop groups such as Oasis. The initial recording sessions were productive, and the band's songwriting process became looser and more relaxed compared to previous albums. Encouraged by drummer Lars Ulrich, Hammett played rhythm guitar for the first time on a Metallica album, having previously only played lead parts while Hetfield played all rhythm parts. Hammett said this was done to achieve "a looser sound". He ultimately became more influential in the songwriting process, sharing co-writing credits with Hetfield and Ulrich on six of the final album's thirteen tracks. After being excluded from the songwriting process on Load, bassist Jason Newsted received a co-writing credit on "Where the Wild Things Are" for writing the music.

After Load's release in June 1996, Metallica embarked on the Poor Touring Me tour in support of the album from September 1996 to May 1997. At the end of the tour, the band announced its follow-up, Reload, to be released in November. Additional sessions for Reload occurred between July and October 1997, during which the band re-did guitar parts and added additional overdubs and vocals. Due to tight deadlines, work was split between three rooms at The Plant: guitars and vocals were recorded in one room, while Newsted overdubbed bass in another and Ulrich tweaked his drum parts in a third.

The band members felt a new sense of maturity during these sessions, particularly after Hetfield and drummer Lars Ulrich's marriages. They continued the experimentation they began on Load. Under the guidance of Faith No More's Jim Martin, Hetfield hired the musician David Miles to play hurdy-gurdy on "Low Man's Lyric", while assistant recording engineer Bernardo Bigalli added violin to the track. Ulrich explained: "It's in the same vein as [the Load track] 'Mama Said', which had kind of a country feel." Hammett added various guitar effects using different pedals, such as ones by Electro-Harmonix and Roland Corporation on "Prince Charming" and a DigiTech Whammy on "Devil's Dance". He also utilized wah-wah effects throughout Reload, particularly on "Where the Wild Things Are".

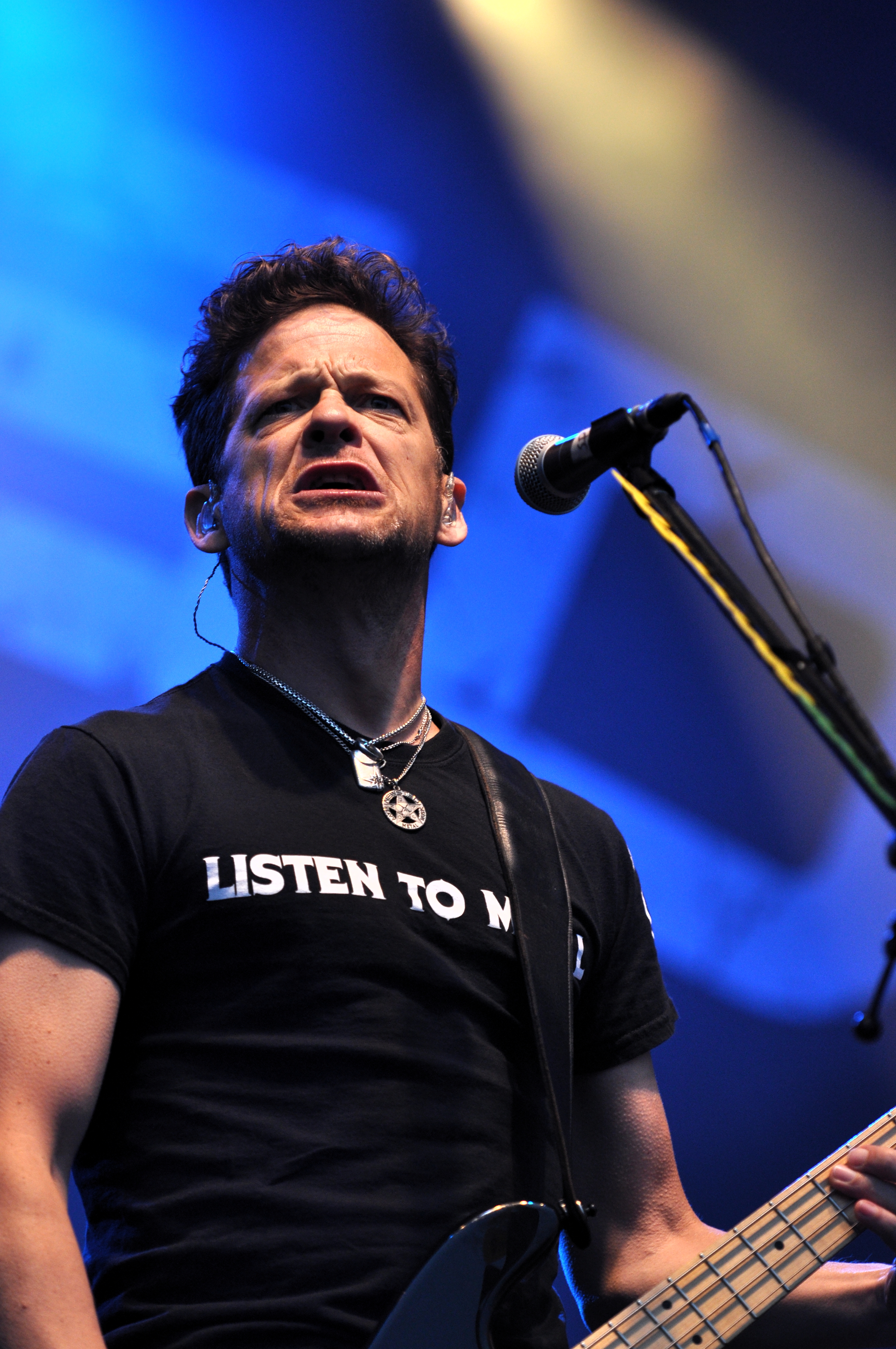
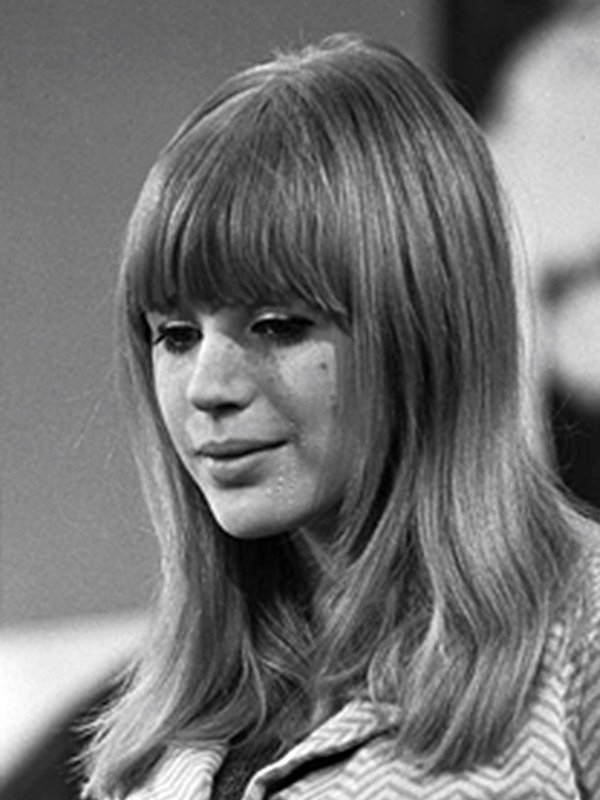
Reload was Metallica's final studio album to feature bassist Jason Newsted (left, in 2013) and first album to feature a guest vocalist, with Marianne Faithfull (right, in 1966) appearing on "The Memory Remains".

Reload marked Metallica's first album to feature a guest vocalist, with Marianne Faithfull appearing on the track "The Memory Remains". It is the only song in Metallica's discography, apart from Lulu, the band's 2011 collaboration with Lou Reed, in which Hetfield shares lead vocals with a guest. Faithfull was contacted by the band at Rock's recommendation. Other singers reportedly considered included Carly Simon, Patti Smith, and Joni Mitchell, although Hetfield and Ulrich said that Faithfull was their only choice. Ulrich said: "We needed someone charismatic, someone ... weathered in every possible way." Faithfull recorded her vocals for the song, reportedly while intoxicated, on August 21, 1997, at Windmill Lane Studios in Dublin, Ireland, during the band's stop there en route to three festival dates in Europe.

Reload was Metallica's final studio album to feature Newsted, who departed the band in January 2001 for "private and personal reasons". Since 1995, he had been collaborating with different artists and recording material at his own studio, The Chophouse, which Hetfield disliked. In 2000, while the other band members were spending time with their families, he had formed the group Echobrain and intended to release music with them, which Hetfield forbade. Newsted, amidst years of growing resentment, felt trapped in his role in Metallica and decided to leave. In later interviews, Hetfield and Ulrich felt Newsted remained isolated from the other members during his tenure in the band and never got close to them.

== Composition ==
=== Music ===
We're just slowly integrating other styles and techniques into our music, which is something any artist does, whether they're a musician or a painter or a race car driver or hairstylist. After a while, if you're truly devoted to what you're doing, you'll take on a lot of influence and integrate it into your own style to make things less boring.

— Kirk Hammett, Guitar World, 1997

Like its predecessor, Reload continued Metallica's stylistic departure from their thrash metal roots in favor of a hard rock sound. Speaking in 1997, Ulrich commented that "As far as I'm concerned, you can take any of these songs and interchange them on the two albums." The authors Joel McIver and Paul Stenning argue that with Load and Reload, Metallica recognized and adapted to a changing music scene, compared to other metal bands such as Slayer, who stuck to their formula.

Primarily a hard rock and heavy metal album, Reload features experimentations with blues, psychedelia, country, Southern rock, alternative rock, and grunge. Reviewers have described the music as being riff-heavy, with emphasis on rhythm and melodic rock 'n' roll. Metallica had listed several artists and bands they were inspired by while writing Load and Reload that took them away from their thrash roots, including Alice in Chains, Soundgarden, Primus, Pantera, Ted Nugent, Oasis, and Alanis Morissette, among others. Other influences by 1970s hard rock bands such as Led Zeppelin and AC/DC can be heard on songs such as "Slither" and "Bad Seed". Newsted believed that "Fixxxer" is "what Black Sabbath would have sounded like if they stayed together in October 1997".

Reload features Metallica's first sequel song, "The Unforgiven II", the follow-up to "The Unforgiven" from Metallica (1991). Hetfield and Ulrich came up with the idea to record a sequel as a means of doing something they had not done before. Hetfield had purchased a new Fender Telecaster guitar with a B-Bender and began playing "The Unforgiven"'s riff, believing it "sounded new enough. So I thought, 'Fuck. This could be another song. Well, should we hide the fact that it's 'Unforgiven?' No, let's just make it a continuation." Compared to the original, "The Unforgiven II" replaces the Spaghetti Western-style intricacies with "a sense of real emotion". The band later recorded a third song, "The Unforgiven III", for their ninth studio album, Death Magnetic (2008).

According to McIver, allowing Hammett to play rhythm guitar led to a looser, less "metal" and more "rock" sound, a result of Hetfield's growing maturity and the band's "desire to move forward". Hetfield and Hammett's dual rhythm guitar roles are prominent throughout the album, particularly on "Carpe Diem Baby". Hammett's guitar solo on "Better than You" features double stops, a style the guitarist had used prominently during the 1980s. Hammett said he played it this way for a fan who had confronted him about it in 1994.

=== Lyrics ===
Hetfield's lyrics throughout Reload were heavily inspired by Nick Cave and the Bad Seeds; the group's name is alluded to in the title of "Bad Seed". Hetfield's tormented childhood inspired several lyrics, with the author Benoît Clerc believing the "bad seed" in the aforementioned song referred to the days of the singer's youth when fights were a daily occurrence; anger and aggression are prominent themes on songs like "Attitude". Hetfield himself said in 1997: "I think anger and aggression are just part of our personalities. ... It was never put on so you can't just take it off. Life is much easier for us now than it was ten years ago, [but] there are still things in my past that still piss me off. ... I don't think those initial feelings will ever go away." "Where the Wild Things Are", named after the 1963 children's book of the same name, similarly recalls childhood traumas.

The opening track, "Fuel", is a hymn to fast cars, mainly inspired by Hetfield's love of custom cars. "The Memory Remains" is about a fading Hollywood star, partly inspired by the 1950 film Sunset Boulevard. "Devil's Dance" features a character being possessed by the Devil and forced to dance. "The Unforgiven II" contains lyrics about battles won, lost, or thrown away. Whereas "The Unforgiven" was sung as a narrative, "II" is sung in a first-person perspective. The main character sings to a female counterpart, both of whom have undergone serious trauma. "Low Man's Lyric" is a ballad about a homeless man expressing frustrations at the world, while "Prince Charming" is told from the perspective of a malevolent character in multiple unpleasant scenarios. In "Fixxxer", the narrator is a voodoo doll, desperately asking its torturer to stop torturing them.

== Artwork and packaging ==
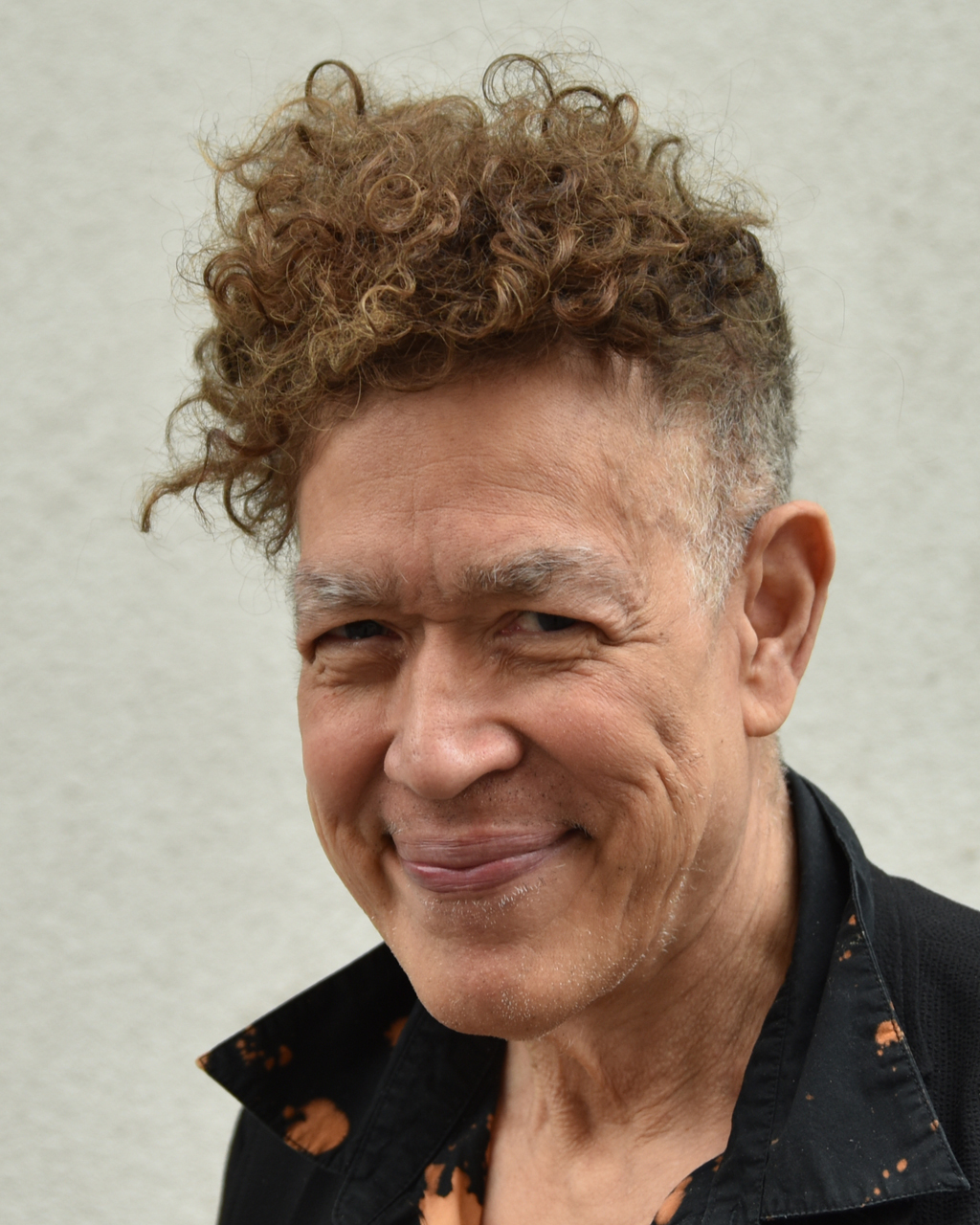
The cover art for Reload was created by the New York artist Andres Serrano (pictured in 2023).

Like Load, the cover artwork for Reload is a painting by the New York artist Andres Serrano. Titled Piss and Blood, the artwork is a "red-tinged amber landscape" with a central swirl in the middle. It was created using a mixture of blood and the artist's own urine. According to Serrano, Piss and Blood, along with Load's artwork Semen and Blood III, were part of a series called "Bodily Fluids", which were "photographs intended to look like paintings, using milk, blood, piss and semen". In a 1997 interview with Guitar World, Hetfield explained that Load and Reload "belong together" so the artwork had to match. While Ulrich and Hammett were fans of Serrano's work, Hetfield disliked it, saying in 2009 that it was art made "for the sake of shocking others". In a 2018 interview, Ulrich maintained his appreciation for the Load and Reload covers, calling them his favorite Metallica album covers. Like Load, Reload's cover featured a new Metallica logo that simplified and modernized its appearance, going from "metal" to "alternative", in the author Mick Wall's words.

== Release and promotion ==
Metallica promoted Reload in the build-up to the album's release with various live performances, including at three European festivals in August 1997. They also collaborated with DJ Spooky on a remix of their 1984 song "For Whom the Bell Tolls", titled "For Whom the Bell Tolls (The Irony of it All)", for the soundtrack of the 1997 film Spawn, released on July 29. In October, they performed two acoustic-only sets at the annual Bridge School Benefit shows in San Francisco; at the first show, the band debuted "Low Man's Lyric". On November 11, Metallica performed a free concert in the parking lot of the CoreStates Center in Philadelphia, Pennsylvania. Dubbed the "Million Decibel March", they played a mix of old and new songs, including "The Memory Remains" and "Fuel". Two days later, they played another free concert at the nightclub Ministry of Sound in London. In December, the band performed with Faithfull on NBC's Saturday Night Live and BBC's Top of the Pops, and later at the Billboard Music Awards.

Reload was released 17 months after Load on November 18, 1997, (Note: Reportedly released a day earlier in the UK on November 17.) through Elektra Records in the United States and Vertigo Records in the United Kingdom and Europe, in CD, cassette, and double LP formats. Like its predecessor, Reload debuted at number one on the US Billboard 200, selling 436,000 units in its first week and remaining on the chart for 75 weeks. In 2025, it was certified 4× platinum by the Recording Industry Association of America (RIAA) for shipping four million copies in the United States. The album also attained number one positions in Austria, Finland, Germany, New Zealand, Norway, and Sweden. Elsewhere, Reload reached number two in Australia, Canada, Denmark, and Hungary; number three in the Netherlands, France, and Switzerland; number four in Belgian Flanders and the UK; number five in Ireland and Spain; number six in Italy and Scotland; and number 14 in Belgian Wallonia. Overall sales were less than Load.

=== Singles ===
"The Memory Remains" was released as the lead single on November 10, 1997. Its music video, directed by Paul Andresen, features the band standing on a suspended platform while a structure rotates around them, giving the impression of anti-gravity. It was shot at the Van Nuys Airport in Los Angeles, California, in October 1997, and cost more than $400,000. The single reached number 28 on the US Billboard Hot 100; it was Metallica's last appearance in the top forty until "The Day That Never Comes" in 2008. It also peaked at number three on the Billboard Mainstream Rock chart and number 13 on the UK Singles Chart.

"The Unforgiven II" was released as the second single on February 23, 1998. It stalled at number 59 on the Billboard Hot 100, but reached number two on the Mainstream Rock chart and number 15 in the UK. Its accompanying music video echoes the song's abstract story of struggle, featuring clips of a young man who finds his hand stuck in a wall but is later freed. It was directed by Matt Mahurin, who previously directed the video for "The Unforgiven", and filmed in December 1997 in Los Angeles.

"Fuel" was released as the third single on June 22, 1998. It reached number six on the Mainstream Rock chart and number 31 in the UK. Its music video was directed by Wayne Isham and filmed in May 1998 in Tokyo, Japan. "Better than You" appeared as a promotional single in the US in July 1998. It won the Grammy Award for Best Metal Performance at the 41st Annual Grammy Awards in 1999; "Fuel" was nominated for Best Hard Rock Performance at the same ceremony. In March 1999, Reload won a California Music Award for Outstanding Hard Rock Album.

=== Tour and aftermath ===
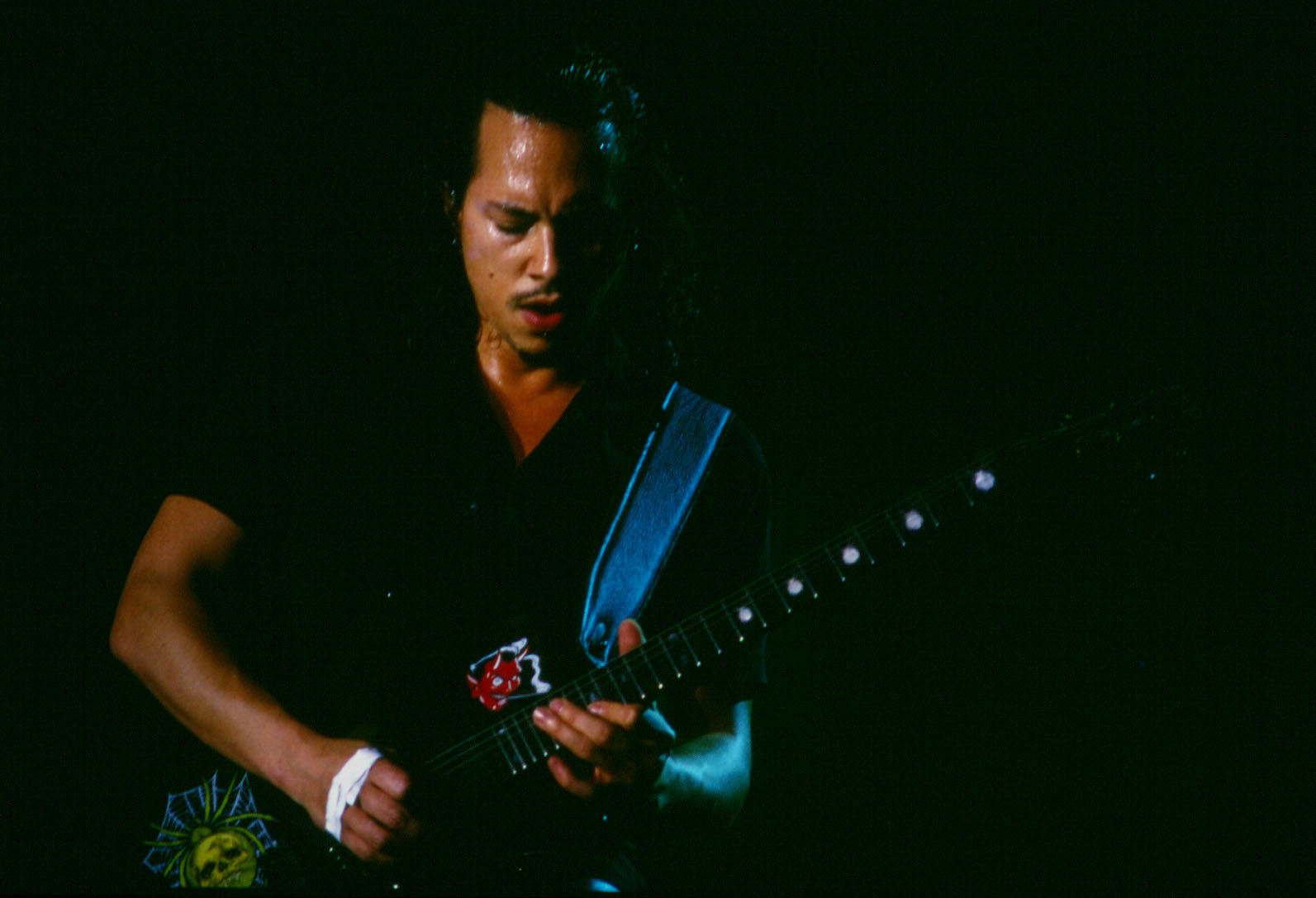
Guitarist Kirk Hammett performing in 1998

From April to May 1998, Metallica embarked on the Poor Re-Touring Me tour, performing in Australia, New Zealand, Korea, and Japan. The US leg ran from June to September 1998. Hetfield's daughter was born on June 11, while Ulrich's son was born shortly afterward on August 5.

The day after the tour ended, Metallica began recording a new album of cover versions. Titled Garage Inc., the collection consisted of newly recorded covers and every cover the band had recorded up to that point, including The $5.98 E.P. – Garage Days Re-Revisited EP (1987) in its entirety. The compilation was released on November 24, 1998. Wall believes the album was released in part to combat bootlegs of the material, and to reestablish credibility within the metal community after Metallica's reinvention for Load and Reload; the band's original logo returned on the cover of Garage Inc., while the front cover featured a photo of the band by the photographer Anton Corbijn. It peaked at number two on the Billboard 200.

Following Garage Inc., Metallica performed at Woodstock '99 and recorded a live album and accompanying video with the San Francisco Symphony, released as S&M in November 1999. Throughout 2000, the band, mainly Ulrich, was embroiled in a controversy with the peer-to-peer file-sharing service Napster after their song "I Disappear" was shared on the site before its official release, leading to a lawsuit against the service. The lawsuit damaged the band's reputation. Following Newsted's departure from Metallica in January 2001, the remaining members began work on what became their eighth studio album, St. Anger (2003).

== Critical reception ==
Professional ratings
Review scores
Source	Rating
AllMusic	3/5 stars
Chicago Tribune	3/4 stars
Collector's Guide to Heavy Metal	7/10
The Encyclopedia of Popular Music	3/5 stars
Entertainment Weekly	B
Los Angeles Times	3.5/4 stars
NME	6/10
The Plain Dealer	B
Rolling Stone	3/5 stars
The Rolling Stone Album Guide	2/5 stars
USA Today	3.5/4 stars

Reload received mixed to favorable reviews from music critics. The album received comparisons to its predecessor. Writing for Billboard, Paul Verna described Reload as "darker, more immediate, and more rough-edged than its predecessor" and believed that the band's exploration of "hard-edged modern rock" would bode well for long-term success. USA Today's Edna Gundersen wrote that the songs "stack up against Load's mother lode of rock riches". Rolling Stone's Lorraine Ali said Reload was not Metallica's best, but named it and Load as stepping stones in Metallica's legacy. Greg Kot of the Chicago Tribune believed that the two albums could have been combined to form one "great" one, saying that as they stand, both albums are spread thin and make up "two solid but flawed ones".

Some critics praised the band's performances, with Kot writing that Hetfield "turns in the most varied and nuanced performances of his career". Others praised it for the band's growing maturity. Musician magazine felt the album "captures one of rock's greatest bands at its peak". Uncut magazine's Neil Kulkarni called Reload one of the best metal albums of the 1990s, arguing it was on par with Metallica. AllMusic's Stephen Thomas Erlewine thought that certain songs, such as "Fixxxer", "successfully push the outer edges of Metallica's sound" and make the record "worthwhile", but believed that multiple filler tracks prevent Reload from being a "full success". Marc Weingarten of the Los Angeles Times said that Reload is "strong enough to make you forgive the band its past concessions to mass tastes". Canadian journalist Martin Popoff lamented the "dull, unfinished, unrealized" songwriting in many songs, but praised the production and groove of the album. The Plain Dealer's John Soeder mildly criticized the long songs but wrote that "these trailblazing metallurgists have seized the day". In 2020, Metal Hammer included Reload in their list of the top 10 albums of 1997.

The album received some negative reviews from critics, several of whom criticized it for a lack of innovation. James Muretich of the Calgary Herald believed that the band's sound was turning predictable and they were becoming "very much like metal world's version of ZZ Top, the increasingly weary purveyors of recycled riffs". In The Morning Call, Gary Blockus described Reload as the first Metallica album "with nothing remarkable or magic". In The Washington Post, Mark Jenkins said that "songs [such as "Fuel"] are more economical than they would have been in the band's early days, but otherwise come as no great surprise." Several critics also disregarded the idea of the sequel song "The Unforgiven II". In his 2012 biography Enter Night, Mick Wall calls Reload the "nadir" of Metallica's recording career. The author Joel McIver believed that Reload was "pure mediocrity" and worse than Load.

== Legacy ==
Opinions on Load and Reload have been mixed in the years and decades following its release. Both albums have typically placed low in lists ranking Metallica's studio albums. (Note: Attributed to multiple references:) Similar to Load, Reload has primarily been criticized for being overlong and containing filler. Several have argued that the two albums could have been one good album, but the band was "too loose" regarding editing. (Note: Attributed to multiple references:) The author Paul Stenning argues that by including every song written during the period, the material's immediacy and longevity were "diluted", leaving "too much to digest and too little inspiration behind many tracks". The authors Paul Brannigan and Ian Winwood similarly wrote that "the sheer volume of material recorded for both albums meant that the wood was lost to the trees". The author Malcolm Dome argues that both albums share the same strengths and weaknesses, ultimately representing a drop in Metallica's "impeccable" standards. He says the two albums "capture a band gently probing its boundaries, but still reticent to leave the family home".

The band has held mixed opinions on the Load and Reload period in subsequent decades. Hetfield felt he was following Hammett and Ulrich's vision and did not believe in the idea of revamping their image. He further said that the large number of songs "diluted the potency of the poison of Metallica". Hetfield also believed that former bassist Cliff Burton, if still alive, would likely have disapproved of the direction the band took for the two albums. Nevertheless, Hetfield did not regret the period because it "felt like the right thing to do" at the time. When interviewed in 2002, Ulrich said he liked some of the material from Load and Reload and was more disappointed that fans reacted poorly to the music based on the band members' new image rather than the music itself. By 2003, Ulrich agreed that the two albums could have been condensed into one, but felt that at the time, he and Hetfield wanted to release all the newly written songs and lacked "an edit button on our instrument panel". He also admitted that releasing a shorter album was "an interesting idea" but "wasn't one we ever considered".

== 2026 box set ==
Professional ratings
Deluxe box set
Review scores
Source	Rating
Rolling Stone	3.5/5 stars

Reload was released as a super deluxe box set on June 26, 2026. Featuring 15 CDs and four DVDs, the set includes a remastered version of the album by Reuben Cohen, live recordings, rough mixes, and demos. The physical release also includes a hardcover book, posters, and other memorabilia. The reissue brought Reload back into the charts, including a numer one placement on Billboard's Top Hard Rock Albums chart. It also re-entered the Billboard 200 at number 16.

Reviewing the box set, Rolling Stone's Kory Grow described Reload as a more nuanced and diversified record compared to Load, but believed that both albums contained large amounts of filler and, if combined into a single LP, would have been a "four-and-a-half-star album". On the contents of the box set, Grow believed the collection made for an interesting insight into the band's musical experimentations and excursions during the period. He particularly praised the live recordings for the band's energetic performances. He ultimately believed that, despite criticism Load and Reload received from fans, "when Metallica lost themselves, they found themselves more truly and more strange. And they will never sound that way again."

== Track listing ==
All lyrics are written by James Hetfield.

Reload track listing
No.	Title	Music	Length
1.	"Fuel"	Hetfield; Lars Ulrich; Kirk Hammett	4:29
2.	"The Memory Remains"	Hetfield; Ulrich	4:39
3.	"Devil's Dance"	Hetfield; Ulrich	5:18
4.	"The Unforgiven II"	Hetfield; Ulrich; Hammett	6:36
5.	"Better than You"	Hetfield; Ulrich	5:21
6.	"Slither"	Hetfield; Ulrich; Hammett	5:13
7.	"Carpe Diem Baby"	Hetfield; Ulrich; Hammett	6:12
8.	"Bad Seed"	Hetfield; Ulrich; Hammett	4:05
9.	"Where the Wild Things Are"	Hetfield; Ulrich; Jason Newsted	6:52
10.	"Prince Charming"	Hetfield; Ulrich	6:04
11.	"Low Man's Lyric"	Hetfield; Ulrich	7:36
12.	"Attitude"	Hetfield; Ulrich	5:16
13.	"Fixxxer"	Hetfield; Ulrich; Hammett	8:15
Total length:			76:03

== Personnel ==
Credits are adapted from the album's liner notes.

Metallica

- James Hetfield – guitars, vocals
- Lars Ulrich – drums
- Kirk Hammett – guitars
- Jason Newsted – bass

Additional musicians

- Jim McGillveray – additional percussion
- Marianne Faithfull – additional vocals on "The Memory Remains"
- David Miles – hurdy-gurdy on "Low Man's Lyric"
- Bernardo Bigalli – violin on "Low Man's Lyric"

Production

- Bob Rock – production
- James Hetfield – assistant production
- Lars Ulrich – assistant production
- Randy Staub – recording, mixing
- Brian Dobbs – additional engineering
- Kent Matcke – assistant engineering
- Darren Grahn – assistant engineering, digital editing
- Gary Winger – assistant engineering
- Bernardo Bigalli – assistant engineering
- Mike Fraser – mixing
- George Marino – mastering
- Paul DeCarli – digital editing
- Mike Gillies – digital editing
- Andie Airfix – design
- Andres Serrano – cover art
- Anton Corbijn – photography

== Charts ==
=== Weekly charts ===
Weekly chart performance for Reload
Chart (1997–98)	Peak position
Australian Albums (ARIA)	2
Austrian Albums (Ö3 Austria)	1
Belgian Albums (Ultratop Flanders)	4
Belgian Albums (Ultratop Wallonia)	14
Canadian Albums (Billboard)	2
Danish Albums (Hitlisten)	2
Dutch Albums (Album Top 100)	3
European Albums (Billboard)	2
Finnish Albums (Suomen virallinen lista)	1
French Albums (SNEP)	3
German Albums (Offizielle Top 100)	1
Hungarian Albums (MAHASZ)	2
Irish Albums (IRMA)	5
Italian Albums (FIMI)	6
New Zealand Albums (RMNZ)	1
Norwegian Albums (VG-lista)	1
Scottish Albums (Official Charts)	6
Spanish Albums (AFYVE)	5
Swedish Albums (Sverigetopplistan)	1
Swiss Albums (Schweizer Hitparade)	3
UK Albums (Official Charts)	4
US Billboard 200	1

Chart (2021)	Peak position
Polish Albums (ZPAV)	11

Chart (2026)	Peak position
Austrian Albums (Ö3 Austria)	6
Belgian Albums (Ultratop Wallonia)	6
Canadian Albums (Billboard)	9
Croatian International Albums (HDU)	9
German Rock & Metal Albums (Offizielle Top 100)	3
Greek Albums (IFPI)	5
Hungarian Physical Albums (MAHASZ)	4
Norwegian Rock Albums (IFPI Norge)	3
Scottish Albums (Official Charts)	4
Swiss Albums (Schweizer Hitparade)	6
UK Rock & Metal Albums (Official Charts)	3
US Top Hard Rock Albums (Billboard)	1
US Top Rock & Alternative Albums (Billboard)	4

=== Year-end charts ===
1997 year-end chart performance for Reload
Chart (1997)	Position
Australian Albums (ARIA)	32
Austrian Albums (Ö3 Austria)	44
Belgian Albums (Ultratop Flanders)	39
Belgian Albums (Ultratop Wallonia)	64
Canadian Albums (Nielsen Soundscan)	45
Dutch Albums (Album Top 100)	100
European Top 100 Albums (Music & Media)	73
French Albums (SNEP)	40
German Albums (Offizielle Top 100)	48
Swedish Albums (Sverigetopplistan)	17

1998 year-end chart performance for Reload
Chart (1998)	Position
Australian Albums (ARIA)	75
Belgian Albums (Ultratop Flanders)	79
Dutch Albums (Album Top 100)	58
European Top 100 Albums (Music & Media)	51
German Albums (Offizielle Top 100)	30
US Billboard 200	12

2021 year-end chart performance for Reload
Chart (2021)	Position
Polish Albums (ZPAV)	48

== Certifications and sales ==
Certifications and sales for Reload
Region	Certification	Certified units/sales
Argentina (CAPIF)	Platinum	60,000^{^}
Australia (ARIA)	5× Platinum	350,000^{‡}
Austria (IFPI Austria)	Gold	25,000^{*}
Belgium (BRMA)	Gold	25,000^{*}
Canada (Music Canada)	2× Platinum	200,000^{^}
Estonia	—	5,000
Finland (Musiikkituottajat)	Platinum	45,271
France (SNEP)	Gold	100,000^{*}
Germany (BVMI)	5× Gold	1,250,000^{‡}
Hong Kong (IFPI Hong Kong)	Gold	10,000^{*}
Japan (RIAJ)	Platinum	200,000^{^}
Netherlands (NVPI)	Gold	50,000^{^}
New Zealand (RMNZ)	Platinum	15,000^{^}
Poland (ZPAV)	Platinum	100,000^{*}
Russia	—	20,000
Spain (Promusicae)	Platinum	100,000^{^}
Sweden (GLF)	Platinum	80,000^{^}
Switzerland (IFPI Switzerland)	Platinum	50,000^{^}
United Kingdom (BPI)	Gold	100,000^{^}
United States (RIAA)	4× Platinum	4,480,000
Summaries
Europe (IFPI)	2× Platinum	2,000,000^{*}
^{*} Sales figures based on certification alone.^{^} Shipments figures based on certification alone.^{‡} Sales+streaming figures based on certification alone.
