= The Memory Remains =

1997 single by Metallica

Single by Metallica

from the album Reload
- B-side: "For Whom the Bell Tolls" (mix)
- Released: November 10, 1997
- Genre: Hard rock
- Length: 4:38
- Label: Elektra
- Composers: James Hetfield; Lars Ulrich
- Lyricist: James Hetfield
- Producers: Bob Rock; James Hetfield; Lars Ulrich

Metallica singles chronology
"Bleeding Me" (1997)	"The Memory Remains" (1997)	"The Unforgiven II" (1998)

Music video
- "The Memory Remains" on YouTube

"The Memory Remains" is a song by American heavy metal band Metallica. Written by James Hetfield and Lars Ulrich, it was the lead single from the band's seventh studio album, Reload, released in 1997. The song was first performed live in a "jam" version on July 2, 1996. British singer Marianne Faithfull provides uncredited backing vocals, as Hetfield felt her "weathered, smellin'-the-cigarettes-on-the-CD voice" fit what he described as "the whole eeriness of the Sunset Boulevard-feel of the song", given the lyrics tell the story of a faded artist who goes insane from losing her fame.

The spoken words "Say yes, at least say hello", during the outro, are a reference to The Misfits, the last complete movie in which Marilyn Monroe starred.

It can be heard playing in the strip club Bada Bing! in the episode of The Sopranos, "The Knight in White Satin Armor". It is also used as one of the theme songs for WrestleMania XXVIII.

Asked if he would have bought Reload, bassist Jason Newsted said, "Not if I heard 'The Memory Remains' first."

== Demo ==
The song's demo was called "Memory" and was recorded in Lars Ulrich's home musical studio "Dungeon" on March 6, 1995, (take 1) and March 17, 1995 (take 2).

== Other versions ==
The band, with Marianne Faithfull, performed the song on the December 6, 1997, edition of Saturday Night Live. A live version was released as B-side to the single "The Unforgiven II". It was later performed with the San Francisco Symphony (conducted by Michael Kamen) for S&M and again for S&M2 (conducted by Edwin Outwater). Another live version was included on Orgullo, Pasión y Gloria. During the band's 30th anniversary celebration at the San Francisco's Fillmore in December 2011, Faithfull again joined Metallica on stage for "The Memory Remains".

== Critical reception ==
Larry Flick from Billboard wrote, "Rock radio is already way hip to this smokin' jam from the band's new album, "Re-load". The time has come for popsters to climb aboard and join the fun. With its grinding, slow groove and winding melody, "The Memory Remains" has the traditional song structure and crisp production needed to attract listeners who don't usually indulge in such guitar-heavy fare. In fact, this song has the potential to draw a pile of new people into the band's already massive legion of fans."

== Chart performance ==
The single was successful, reaching number 28 on the Billboard Hot 100, number three on the Mainstream Rock Tracks chart and number 13 on the UK Singles Chart. It was Metallica's last appearance within the top 40 of the Billboard Hot 100 until 2008's "The Day That Never Comes". The song was Faithfull's first top-40 single on the Hot 100 since 1965's "Summer Nights" as well as her last.

== Music video ==
According to Encyclopedia Metallica, the video was shot at the Van Nuys Airport and cost $400,000, with the large platform costing over $100,000. It premiered on 4 November 1997. The video broadcast by MTV's Mattrock on November 15, 1997.

The music video features a surreal, anti-gravity concept. The band plays on a large, suspended platform making full and continuous rotations throughout the performance, like an enormous swing. The platform and band are actually stationary and the room, a giant constructed box, spins around it. Faithfull sings in a dark corridor and turns the crank of a street organ, the crank presumably attached to the rotating platform upon which the band plays. In some scenes paper money rains down, an allegorical reference. Throughout the music video, Jason Newsted fingerpicks his bass, despite almost exclusively playing with a pick throughout his career.

== Track listing ==
CD single (ReLoad)
No.	Title	Writer(s)	Length
1.	"The Memory Remains"	James Hetfield; Lars Ulrich	4:38
2.	"Fuel (work in progress with different lyrics)"	Hetfield; Ulrich; Kirk Hammett	4:41
3.	"Memory (Demo)"	Hetfield; Ulrich	6:41

CD single (UK pt. 2)
No.	Title	Writer(s)	Length
1.	"The Memory Remains"	Hetfield; Ulrich	4:38
2.	"The Outlaw Torn (Unencumbered by Manufacturing Restrictions Version)"	Hetfield; Ulrich	10:48
3.	"King Nothing (Tepid Mix)"	Hetfield; Ulrich; Hammett	5:07

CD 2-track single (U.S. and Canada) and 7-inch single (Europe)
No.	Title	Writer(s)	Length
1.	"The Memory Remains"	Hetfield; Ulrich	4:38
2.	"For Whom the Bell Tolls (Haven't Heard It Yet Mix)"	Hetfield; Ulrich; Cliff Burton	4:39

== Personnel ==
Metallica

- James Hetfield – guitar, vocals
- Kirk Hammett – guitar
- Jason Newsted – bass
- Lars Ulrich – drums

Additional musicians

- Marianne Faithfull – additional vocals

Production

- "The Memory Remains", "Fuel for Fire", and "The Outlaw Torn" produced by Bob Rock with Hetfield and Ulrich
- "The Memory Remains" and "Fuel for Fire" mixed by Randy Staub
- "The Outlaw Torn" mixed by Mike Fraser
- "The Memory Remains" and "The Outlaw Torn" mastered by George Marino
- "King Nothing (Tepid Mix)" remixed by Sascha Konietzko
- "For Whom the Bell Tolls (Haven't Heard It Yet Mix)" remixed by DJ Spooky

== Charts ==
=== Weekly charts ===
Chart (1997)	Peak position
Australia (ARIA)	6
Austria (Ö3 Austria Top 40)	20
Belgium (Ultratop 50 Flanders)	28
Canada (Nielsen SoundScan)	4
Canada Rock/Alternative (RPM)	25
Czech Republic (IFPI)	4
Denmark (Tracklisten)	13
Europe (Eurochart Hot 100)	13
Finland (Suomen virallinen lista)	1
Germany (GfK)	20
Hungary (Mahasz)	4
Iceland (Íslenski Listinn Topp 40)	1
Ireland (IRMA)	13
Netherlands (Dutch Top 40)	17
Netherlands (Single Top 100)	15
New Zealand (Recorded Music NZ)	23
Norway (VG-lista)	3
Poland Airplay (Music & Media)	12
Scottish Singles Sales (Official Charts)	14
Spain (AFYVE)	3
Sweden (Sverigetopplistan)	4
Switzerland (Schweizer Hitparade)	30
UK Singles (Official Charts)	13
UK Rock & Metal (Official Charts)	1
US Billboard Hot 100	28
US Mainstream Rock (Billboard)	3

=== Year-end charts ===
Chart (1997)	Position
Australia (ARIA)	73
Sweden (Topplistan)	52

Chart (1998)	Position
Iceland (Íslenski Listinn Topp 40)	14
US Mainstream Rock Tracks (Billboard)	35

== Certifications ==
Region	Certification	Certified units/sales
Australia (ARIA)	Platinum	70,000^{‡}
New Zealand (RMNZ)	Gold	15,000^{‡}
United States (RIAA)	Gold	500,000^{‡}
^{‡} Sales+streaming figures based on certification alone.

== Release history ==
Region	Date	Format(s)	Label(s)	Ref.
United Kingdom	November 10, 1997	7-inch vinyl; CD	Vertigo	
Japan	December 26, 1997	CD	Sony	
