= List of UK Rock & Metal Albums Chart number ones of 1998 =

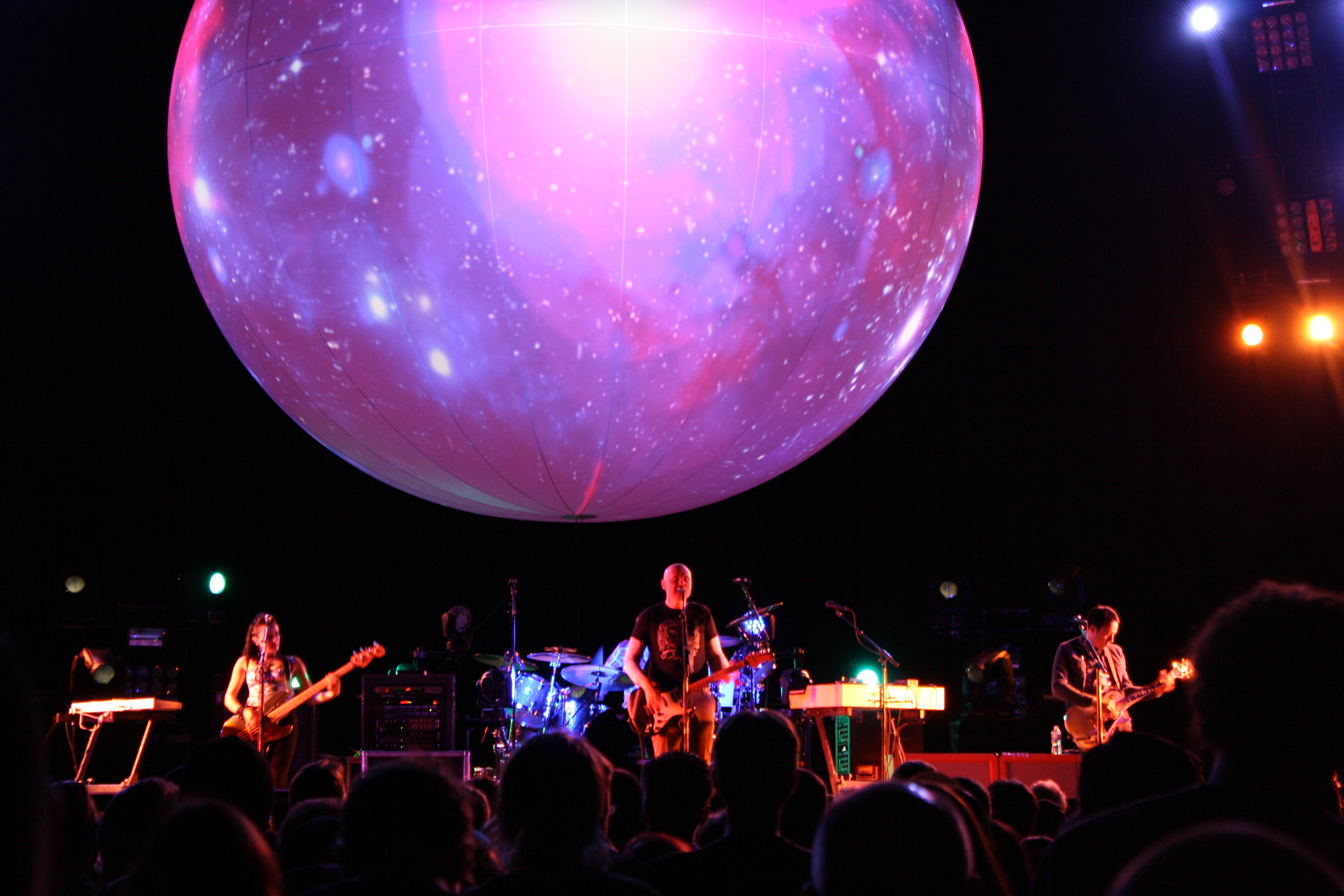
Adore by The Smashing Pumpkins was the longest-running UK Rock & Metal Albums Chart number-one album of 1998, spending five weeks atop the chart.

The UK Rock & Metal Albums Chart is a record chart which ranks the best-selling rock and heavy metal albums in the United Kingdom. Compiled and published by the Official Charts Company, the data is based on each album's weekly physical sales, digital downloads and streams. In 1998, there were 29 albums that topped the 52 published charts. The first number-one album of the year was the Queen compilation Queen Rocks, which was released the previous year and remained at number one for the opening week of 1999 at the end of a five-week run which began in the week ending 6 December 1997. The final number-one album of the year was Metallica's covers album Garage Inc., which spent the last four weeks of the year (and the first one of 1999) at number one.

The most successful album on the UK Rock & Metal Albums Chart in 1998 was Adore, the fourth studio album by American alternative rock band The Smashing Pumpkins, which spent a total of five weeks at number one. Walking into Clarksdale by former Led Zeppelin members Jimmy Page and Robert Plant, Nirvana's 1991 second studio album Nevermind and Metallica's Garage Inc each spent four weeks at number one during 1998; Pearl Jam's fifth studio album Yield, Fear Factory's third studio album Obsolete and the Aerosmith live album A Little South of Sanity were all number one for three weeks during the year; and Dookie by Green Day, Blood Sugar Sex Magik by Red Hot Chili Peppers, Virtual XI by Iron Maiden and Follow the Leader by Korn each spent two weeks atop the chart.

== Chart history ==
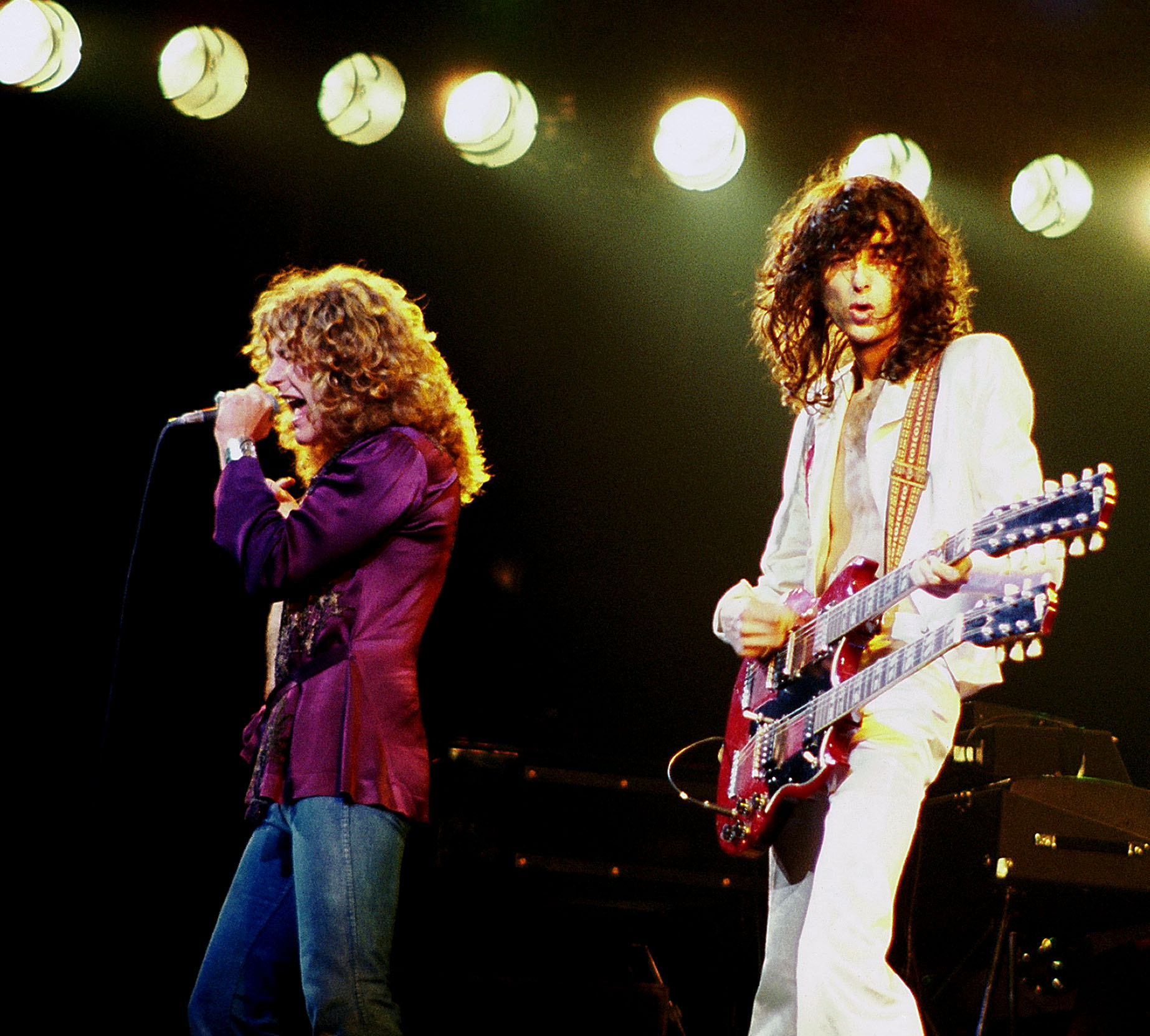
Walking into Clarksdale, the only studio album by former Led Zeppelin members Jimmy Page and Robert Plant, spent four weeks at number one.

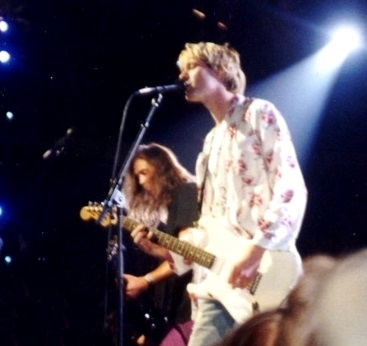
Nirvana's 1991 release Nevermind was number one on the UK Rock & Metal Albums Chart for four weeks in 1998.

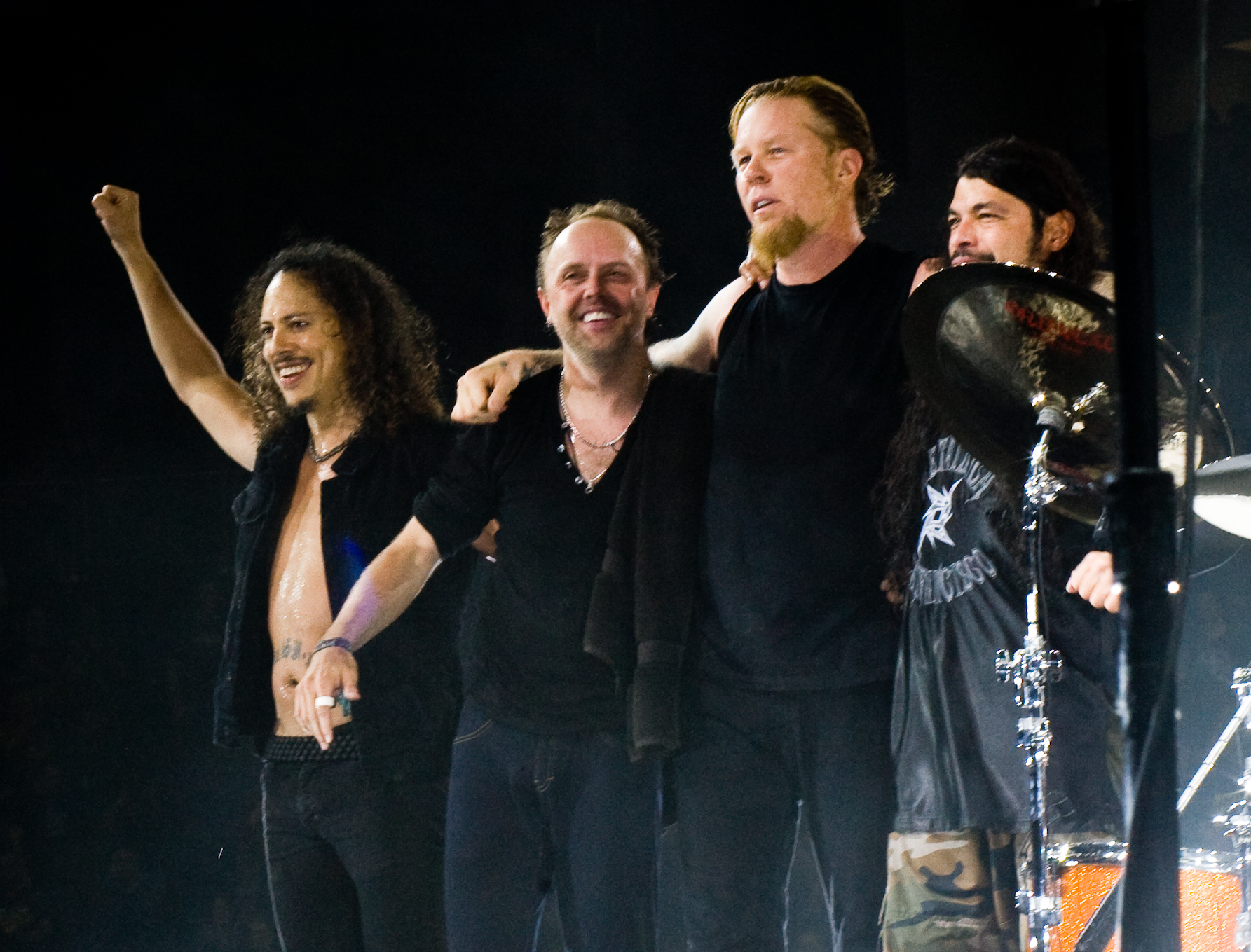
Metallica spent the last four weeks of the year at number one on the chart with the covers album Garage Inc.

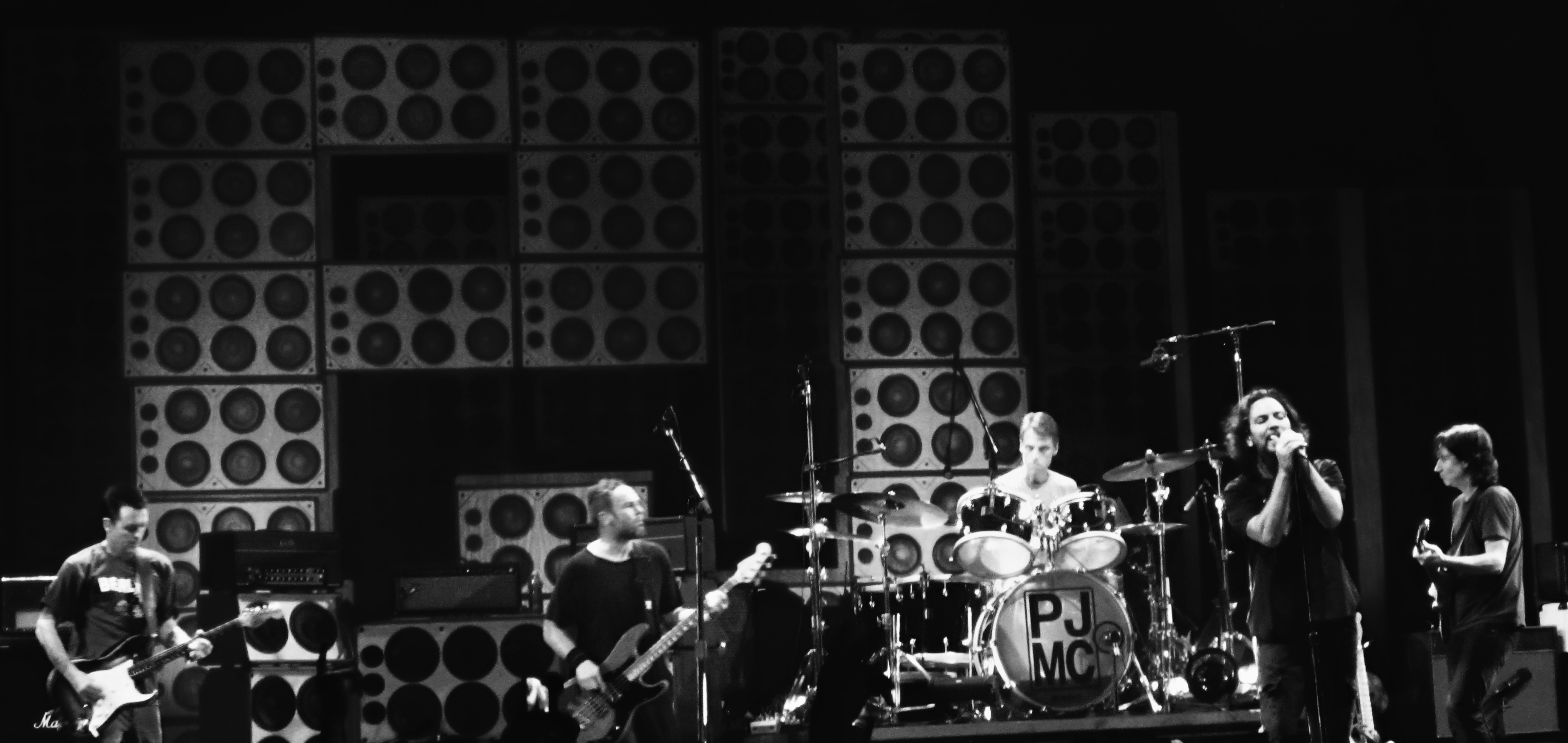
Pearl Jam's fifth studio album Yield was number one for three weeks in 1998.

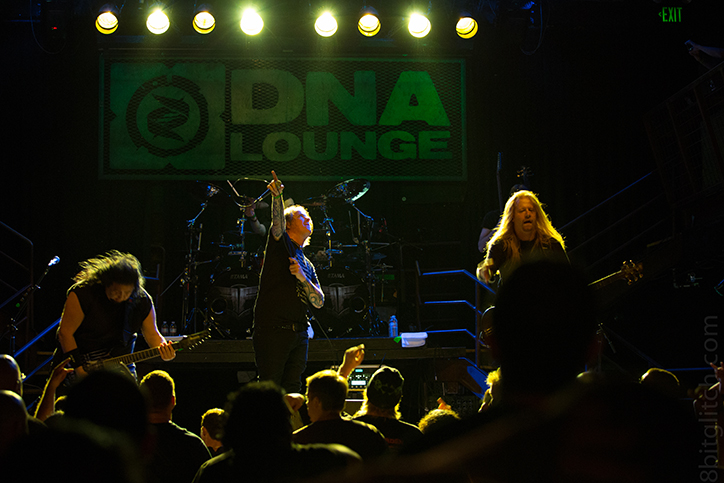
Fear Factory spent three weeks at number one with Obsolete.

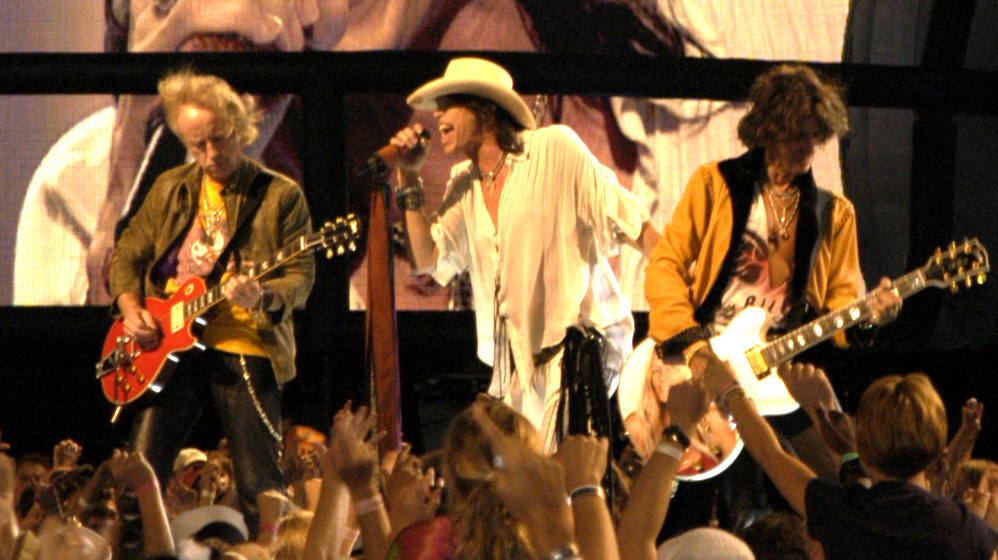
Aerosmith's A Little South of Sanity was number one for three straight weeks.

Key
†	Indicates best-selling rock album of 1998

Issue date	Album	Artist(s)	Record label(s)	Ref.
3 January	Queen Rocks	Queen	Parlophone	
10 January	The Colour and the Shape	Foo Fighters	Roswell	
17 January	BBC Sessions	Led Zeppelin	Atlantic	
24 January	Blood Sugar Sex Magik	Red Hot Chili Peppers	Warner Bros.	
31 January	Dookie	Green Day	Reprise	
7 February	Dookie	Green Day	Reprise	
14 February	Yield	Pearl Jam	Epic	
21 February	Yield	Pearl Jam	Epic	
28 February	Live	Thunder	Eagle	
7 March	Blood Sugar Sex Magik	Red Hot Chili Peppers	Warner Bros.	
14 March	Undiscovered Soul	Richie Sambora	Mercury	
21 March	Crystal Planet	Joe Satriani	Epic	
28 March	Yield	Pearl Jam	Epic	
4 April	Virtual XI	Iron Maiden	EMI	
11 April	Virtual XI	Iron Maiden	EMI	
18 April	Appetite for Destruction	Guns N' Roses	Geffen	
25 April	End Hits	Fugazi	Dischord	
2 May	Walking into Clarksdale	Jimmy Page; Robert Plant	Mercury	
9 May	Walking into Clarksdale	Jimmy Page; Robert Plant	Mercury	
16 May	Walking into Clarksdale	Jimmy Page; Robert Plant	Mercury	
23 May	A Thousand Leaves	Sonic Youth	Geffen	
30 May	Walking into Clarksdale	Jimmy Page; Robert Plant	Mercury	
6 June	Nevermind	Nirvana	Geffen	
13 June	Adore †	The Smashing Pumpkins	Hut	
20 June	Adore †	The Smashing Pumpkins	Hut	
27 June	Adore †	The Smashing Pumpkins	Hut	
4 July	Life Won't Wait	Rancid	Epitaph	
11 July	Nevermind	Nirvana	Geffen	
18 July	Nevermind	Nirvana	Geffen	
25 July	Nevermind	Nirvana	Geffen	
1 August	Adore †	The Smashing Pumpkins	Hut	
8 August	Obsolete	Fear Factory	Roadrunner	
15 August	Obsolete	Fear Factory	Roadrunner	
22 August	Obsolete	Fear Factory	Roadrunner	
29 August	Adore †	The Smashing Pumpkins	Hut	
5 September	Follow the Leader	Korn	Epic	
12 September	Follow the Leader	Korn	Epic	
19 September	Garbage	Garbage	Mushroom	
26 September	The Chemical Wedding	Bruce Dickinson	Air Raid	
3 October	Radiation	Marillion	Raw Power	
10 October	Electric Fire	Roger Taylor	Parlophone	
17 October	Against	Sepultura	Roadrunner	
24 October	30: Very Best of Deep Purple	Deep Purple	EMI	
31 October	A Little South of Sanity	Aerosmith	Geffen	
7 November	A Little South of Sanity	Aerosmith	Geffen	
14 November	A Little South of Sanity	Aerosmith	Geffen	
21 November	Who Cares a Lot? The Greatest Hits	Faith No More	Slash/Reprise/London	
28 November	Americana	The Offspring	Columbia	
5 December	Garage Inc.	Metallica	Vertigo	
12 December	Garage Inc.	Metallica	Vertigo	
19 December	Garage Inc.	Metallica	Vertigo	
26 December	Garage Inc.	Metallica	Vertigo	

== See also ==
- 1998 in British music
- List of UK Rock & Metal Singles Chart number ones of 1998
