= Fuel (Metallica song) =

1998 single by Metallica

Single by Metallica

from the album Reload
- B-side: "Sad but True" (live)
- Released: June 22, 1998
- Studio: The Plant (Sausalito, California)
- Genre: Heavy metal; hard rock
- Length: 4:26
- Label: Elektra
- Composers: James Hetfield; Lars Ulrich; Kirk Hammett
- Lyricist: James Hetfield
- Producers: Bob Rock; James Hetfield; Lars Ulrich

Metallica singles chronology
"The Unforgiven II" (1998)	"Fuel" (1998)	"Better than You" (1998)

Music video
- "Fuel" on YouTube

Audio sample
- Fuel: file; help

Professional ratings
Review scores
Source	Rating
AllMusic	1.5/5 stars

"Fuel" is a song by American heavy metal band Metallica. It was written by James Hetfield, Lars Ulrich, and Kirk Hammett, and was released as the third single from their seventh album, Reload (1997). Inspired by Hetfield's love of custom cars, the song was nominated for a Grammy Award for Best Hard Rock Performance in 1999 but lost to Jimmy Page and Robert Plant for the song "Most High". It was moderately successful on the music charts, peaking at number 2 in Australia, number three in Hungary, number 5 in Finland and number 6 on the US Billboard Mainstream Rock chart.

Since its release, "Fuel" has remained a regular on Metallica's live setlists. It has featured on the live albums Cunning Stunts, S&M, Français Pour une Nuit, Orgullo, Pasión, y Gloria: Tres Noches en la Ciudad de México, Live at Grimey's and Through The Never.

A demo version of the song called "Fuel for Fire" (with different lyrics) was used as the theme song for NASCAR on NBC from 2001 until the 2004 Daytona 500. The song was also featured in the video game Fortnite in the Chapter 5 Season 3 Trailer and in Fortnite Festival.

== Track listings ==
All live tracks were recorded on April 20, 1998, at the Brisbane Entertainment Centre, Brisbane, Australia.

All lyrics are written by James Hetfield.

UK and Australasian CD1
No.	Title	Music	Length
1.	"Fuel"	Hetfield; Lars Ulrich; Kirk Hammett	4:29
2.	"Sad but True" (live)	Hetfield; Ulrich	6:23
3.	"Nothing Else Matters"	Hetfield; Ulrich	6:08

UK and Australasian CD2
No.	Title	Music	Length
1.	"Fuel"	Hetfield; Ulrich; Hammett	4:29
2.	"Wherever I May Roam"	Hetfield; Ulrich	6:48
3.	"One"	Hetfield; Ulrich	8:06

UK and Australasian CD3
No.	Title	Music	Length
1.	"Fuel"	Hetfield; Ulrich; Hammett	4:30
2.	"Until It Sleeps" (live)	Hetfield; Ulrich	4:25
3.	"Fuel" (live)	Hetfield; Ulrich; Hammett	4:40
4.	"Fuel" (demo)	Hetfield; Ulrich; Hammett	4:25

European CD single
No.	Title	Music	Length
1.	"Fuel"	Hetfield; Ulrich; Hammett	4:29
2.	"Sad but True" (live)	Hetfield; Ulrich	6:23

Japanese EP
No.	Title	Music	Length
1.	"Fuel"	Hetfield; Ulrich; Hammett	4:30
2.	"Sad but True" (live)	Hetfield; Ulrich	6:24
3.	"Until It Sleeps" (live)	Hetfield; Ulrich	4:26
4.	"One" (live)	Hetfield; Ulrich	8:07
5.	"Fuel" (demo)	Hetfield; Ulrich; Hammett	4:26

== Personnel ==
Credits are adapted from the album's liner notes.

Metallica

- James Hetfield – guitar, vocals
- Kirk Hammett – guitar
- Jason Newsted – bass
- Lars Ulrich – drums

Additional musician

- Jim McGillveray – additional percussion

== Music video ==
The music video was directed by Wayne Isham and filmed in May 1998 in Tokyo, and premiered on May 14, 1998.

== Charts ==
=== Weekly charts ===
Chart (1998)	Peak position
Australia (ARIA)	2
Belgium (Ultratip Bubbling Under Flanders)	14
Europe (Eurochart Hot 100)	54
Finland (Suomen virallinen lista)	5
Germany (GfK)	57
Hungary (Mahasz)	3
Netherlands (Dutch Top 40 Tipparade)	6
Netherlands (Single Top 100)	53
New Zealand (Recorded Music NZ)	35
Scotland Singles (OCC)	29
Sweden (Sverigetopplistan)	49
UK Singles (OCC)	31
US Mainstream Rock (Billboard)	6

Chart (2026)	Peak position
Greece International (IFPI)	59

=== Year-end charts ===
Chart (1998)	Position
Australia (ARIA)	76

== Certifications ==
Region	Certification	Certified units/sales
Australia (ARIA)	2× Platinum	140,000^{‡}
United Kingdom (BPI)	Silver	200,000^{‡}
^{‡} Sales+streaming figures based on certification alone.

== Release history ==
Region	Date	Format	Label	Ref(s).
United States	March 10, 1998	Alternative radio	Elektra	
United Kingdom	June 22, 1998	CD	Elektra	
Japan	August 26, 1998	CD	Sony	
