= Better than You (Metallica song) =

Promotional single by Metallica

from the album Reload
- Released: July 16, 1998
- Recorded: 1996
- Studio: The Plant (Sausalito, California)
- Genre: Hard rock
- Length: 5:21 (album version); 4:44 (radio edit)
- Label: Elektra
- Composers: James Hetfield; Lars Ulrich
- Lyricist: James Hetfield
- Producers: Bob Rock; James Hetfield; Lars Ulrich

Metallica singles chronology
"Fuel" (1998)	"Better than You" (1998)	"Turn the Page" (1998)

"Better than You" is a song by American heavy metal band Metallica from their 1997 album Reload. It won the 1999 Grammy Award for Best Metal Performance, the band's fourth award in that category.

== Reception ==
The 2011 book Metallica: The Music and the Mayhem describes the song as "qualifying on all grounds, with lyrics full of festering resentment, and Hammett giving a lengthy solo."

Loudwire ranked the song in 94th place in their ranking of every Metallica song, calling it "entirely forgettable" but "nothing particularly offensive."

== Personnel ==
Metallica

- James Hetfield – guitar, vocals, production
- Kirk Hammett – guitar
- Jason Newsted – bass
- Lars Ulrich – drums, production

Additional personnel

- Bob Rock – production
- Jim McGillveray – additional percussion

== Charts ==
Chart (1998)	Peak position
US Mainstream Rock (Billboard)	7
