= The Unforgiven II =

Single by Metallica

from the album Reload
- B-side: "The Thing That Should Not Be" (live)
- Released: February 23, 1998
- Studio: The Plant (Sausalito, California)
- Genre: Heavy metal, Progressive metal
- Length: 6:36
- Label: Elektra
- Composers: James Hetfield; Lars Ulrich; Kirk Hammett
- Lyricist: James Hetfield
- Producers: Bob Rock; James Hetfield; Lars Ulrich

Metallica singles chronology
"The Memory Remains" (1997)	"The Unforgiven II" (1998)	"Fuel" (1998)

Music video
- "The Unforgiven II" on YouTube

"The Unforgiven II" is a song by American heavy metal band Metallica from their 1997 studio album, Reload. It was written by James Hetfield, Lars Ulrich and Kirk Hammett and is the sequel to "The Unforgiven", a song from their 1991 self-titled album. Another sequel, "The Unforgiven III", was released in 2008.

== Composition ==
The chord progression during the verses is similar to the one used in the chorus on "The Unforgiven". Hetfield's verse melody is played with a B-Bender guitar; a guitar that allows the player to bend the B-string independently of other strings.

== Music video ==
"The Unforgiven II" video directed by Matt Mahurin and filmed in December 1997 in Los Angeles and premiered in 20 January 1998.

It is similar to the first video's story, though a tunnel is substituted for the blank room shown in the first video. It begins with a shirtless boy stuck in a wall, showing the wall breaking piece by piece as the boy ages. As the video progresses, it becomes more abstract, with waves crashing on the other side of the wall and rupturing it, making the wall smaller each time. The final scene shows the remaining piece of the wall turning into a woman, with the now older boy's hand still embedded in her back. The boy opens his hand, allowing the woman to take the key out of his hand and allowing him to take his hand out of the wall. The video was directed by Matt Mahurin, who previously directed the video for "The Unforgiven".

== Live performances ==
"The Unforgiven II" was first performed live on December 8, 1997, at that year's Billboard Music Awards. It was not played in a live setting again for the next 17 years, until Metallica re-introduced it into the setlist for their 2015 European festival tours. Following its performance in Gelsenkirchen, Germany's Rock im Revier festival, Metallica then included it in the setlists of their next three shows. The song was not played again until 2024, during the band's Helping Hands Benefit concert. For this performance, the band was joined by musician Avi Vinocur who played B-Bender guitar.

== Track listings ==
International single Part 1
No.	Title	Length
1.	"The Unforgiven II"	6:36
2.	"Helpless" (Live)	4:15
3.	"The Four Horsemen" (Live)	6:19
4.	"Of Wolf and Man" (Live)	4:31

US single
No.	Title	Length
1.	"The Unforgiven II"	6:36
2.	"The Thing That Should Not Be" (Live)	4:40

International single Part 2
No.	Title	Length
1.	"The Unforgiven II"	6:36
2.	"The Thing That Should Not Be" (Live)	7:33
3.	"The Memory Remains" (Live)	4:19
4.	"King Nothing" (Live)	7:14

International single Part 3
No.	Title	Length
1.	"The Unforgiven II"	6:36
2.	"No Remorse" (Live)	4:54
3.	"Am I Evil?" (Live)	5:09
4.	"The Unforgiven II" (Demo)	7:14

Japanese EP
No.	Title	Length
1.	"The Unforgiven II"	6:38
2.	"The Thing That Should Not Be" (Live)	7:31
3.	"The Memory Remains" (Live)	4:28
4.	"No Remorse" (Live)	4:52
5.	"Am I Evil?" (Live)	5:11
6.	"The Unforgiven II" (Demo)	7:13

European single
No.	Title	Length
1.	"The Unforgiven II"	6:36
2.	"The Memory Remains" (Live)	4:19

== Personnel ==
Metallica

- James Hetfield – rhythm guitar, vocals
- Lars Ulrich – drums
- Kirk Hammett – lead guitar
- Jason Newsted – bass

Additional musician

- Jim McGillveray – additional percussion

== Charts ==
=== Weekly charts ===
Chart (1998)	Peak position
Australia (ARIA)	9
Austria (Ö3 Austria Top 40)	18
Europe (Eurochart Hot 100)	18
Finland (Suomen virallinen lista)	1
France (SNEP)	89
Germany (GfK)	23
Greece (IFPI)	8
Hungary (Mahasz)	4
Iceland (Íslenski Listinn Topp 40)	2
Ireland (IRMA)	14
Netherlands (Dutch Top 40)	21
Netherlands (Single Top 100)	25
New Zealand (Recorded Music NZ)	22
Norway (VG-lista)	8
Scottish Singles Sales (Official Charts)	10
Sweden (Sverigetopplistan)	8
UK Singles (Official Charts)	15
UK Rock & Metal (Official Charts)	1
US Billboard Hot 100	59
US Mainstream Rock (Billboard)	2

=== Year-end charts ===
Chart (1998)	Position
Australia (ARIA)	64
Iceland (Íslenski Listinn Topp 40)	21
US Mainstream Rock Tracks (Billboard)	12

== Certifications ==
Region	Certification	Certified units/sales
Australia (ARIA)	Platinum	70,000^{‡}
Denmark (IFPI Danmark)	Gold	45,000^{‡}
New Zealand (RMNZ)	Gold	15,000^{‡}
^{‡} Sales+streaming figures based on certification alone.

== Release history ==
Region	Date	Format(s)	Label(s)	Ref.
United States	January 12, 1998	Alternative radio	Elektra	
United Kingdom	February 23, 1998	CD	Elektra	
Japan	April 22, 1998	CD	Sony	
