= Sonny Rollins discography =

Discography of jazz saxophonist and band leader Sonny Rollins

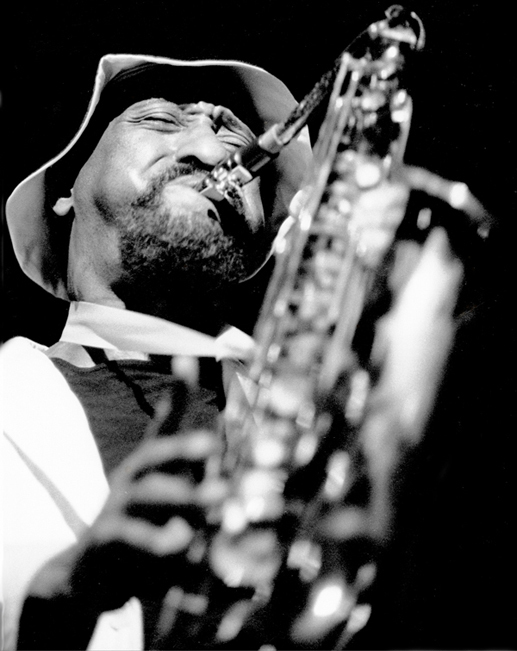
- Rollins performing solo at the San Francisco Opera House in February 1982
- Studio albums: 49
- Live albums: 11
- Appearances: 25

This article presents the discography of the jazz saxophonist and band leader Sonny Rollins.

== Studio albums ==
Date	Album	Label
1953	Sonny Rollins with the Modern Jazz Quartet	Prestige
1954	Moving Out	Prestige
1955	Work Time	Prestige
1956	Sonny Rollins Plus 4	Prestige
1956	Tenor Madness	Prestige
1956	Saxophone Colossus	Prestige
1956	Rollins Plays for Bird	Prestige
1956	Tour de Force	Prestige
1956	Sonny Boy	Prestige
1957	Sonny Rollins, Volume 1	Blue Note
1957	Way Out West	Contemporary
1957	Sonny Rollins, Vol. 2	Blue Note
1957	The Sound of Sonny	Riverside
1957	Newk's Time	Blue Note
1957	Sonny Rollins Plays (split album with Thad Jones)	Period
1958	Freedom Suite	Riverside
1958	Sonny Rollins and the Big Brass	MetroJazz
1958	Sonny Rollins and the Contemporary Leaders	Contemporary
1962	The Bridge	RCA Victor
1962	Sonny's Time	Jazzland
1962	What's New?	RCA Victor
1963	Sonny Meets Hawk!	RCA Victor
1964	Now's the Time	RCA Victor
1964	The Standard Sonny Rollins	RCA Victor
1965	Sonny Rollins on Impulse!	Impulse!
1966	Alfie	Impulse!
1966	East Broadway Run Down	Impulse!
1972	Next Album	Milestone
1973	Horn Culture	Milestone
1975	Nucleus	Milestone
1976	The Way I Feel	Milestone
1977	Easy Living	Milestone
1979	Don't Ask	Milestone
1980	Love at First Sight	Milestone
1981	No Problem	Milestone
1982	Reel Life	Milestone
1984	Sunny Days, Starry Nights	Milestone
1987	Dancing in the Dark	Milestone
1989	Falling in Love with Jazz	Milestone
1991	Here's to the People	Milestone
1993	Old Flames	Milestone
1996	Sonny Rollins + 3	Milestone
1998	Global Warming	Milestone
2000	This Is What I Do	Milestone
2006	Sonny, Please	Emarcy

== Live albums ==
1957	A Night at the "Village Vanguard"	Blue Note
1959	Sonny Rollins at Music Inn	MetroJazz
1959	Oleo 1959	Old Style
1962	Our Man in Jazz	RCA Victor
1965	There Will Never Be Another You	Impulse!
1973	Sonny Rollins in Japan	Victor (Japan)
1974	The Cutting Edge	Milestone
1978	Don't Stop the Carnival	Milestone
1984	St Thomas (In Stockholm, 1959)	Dragon
1985	The Solo Album	Milestone
1987	G-Man	Milestone
2001	Without a Song: The 9/11 Concert	Milestone
2004	Live in London	Harkit Records
2008	Road Shows, Vol. 1	Emarcy
2011	Road Shows, Vol. 2	Emarcy
2014	Road Shows, Vol. 3	Okeh
2016	Road Shows, Vol. 4: Holding the Stage	Okeh

== Compilations ==
1992	The Complete Prestige Recordings (7 CD set)	Prestige

== As sideman ==
With Miles Davis

- Miles Davis and Horns (Prestige, 1951)
- Dig (Prestige, 1951)
- Collectors' Items (Prestige, 1953)
- Bags' Groove (Prestige, 1954)

With Dizzy Gillespie

- Duets (Verve, 1957)
- Sonny Side Up (Verve, 1957) - also with Sonny Stitt

With J. J. Johnson

- J. J. Johnson's Jazz Quintets (Savoy, 1949 [1957]) – four tracks
- Mad Be-Bop (Savoy, 1949 [1978]) – eight tracks (as above, plus alternate takes)
- Trombone By Three (Prestige, 1949 [1956]) – album shared with Kai Winding and Bennie Green, original 78 rpm issues under the New Jazz imprint

With Thelonious Monk

- Monk (Prestige, 1954)
- Thelonious Monk and Sonny Rollins (Prestige, 1956) – 10-inch issue released in 1953
- Brilliant Corners (Riverside, 1957)

With Max Roach

- Live at the Bee Hive (Columbia, 1955, rel., 1979) - Roach co-billed with Clifford Brown
- Clifford Brown and Max Roach at Basin Street (EmArcy, 1956) - Roach co-billed with Clifford Brown
- Max Roach + 4 (EmArcy, 1956)
- Jazz in ¾ Time (EmArcy, 1956–57)

With others

- Kenny Dorham, Jazz Contrasts (Riverside, 1957)
- Art Farmer, Early Art (New Jazz, 1954)
- Babs Gonzales, Weird Lullaby (Blue Note/Capitol, 1949)
- Ernie Henry, Last Chorus (Riverside, 1956)
- Abbey Lincoln, That's Him! (Riverside, 1957)
- The Modern Jazz Quartet, The Modern Jazz Quartet at Music Inn Volume 2 (Atlantic, 1959)
- Fats Navarro, The Fabulous Fats Navarro (Blue Note, 1949)
- Bud Powell, The Amazing Bud Powell (Blue Note, 1949)
- The Rolling Stones, Tattoo You (Rolling Stones Records, 1981)
- McCoy Tyner, Ron Carter, and Al Foster, Milestone Jazzstars in Concert (Milestone, 1978)
