= 3 in Jazz =

Studio album by Gary Burton / Sonny Rollins / Clark Terry
- Released: 1963
- Recorded: February 14 & 20 and March 11, 1963
- Genre: Jazz
- Length: 34:35
- Label: RCA
- Producer: Joe Reisman, George Avakian

Gary Burton chronology
Who Is Gary Burton? (1963)	3 in Jazz (1963)	Something's Coming! (1964)

Sonny Rollins chronology
Our Man in Jazz (1962)	3 in Jazz (1963)	Sonny Meets Hawk! (1963)

Clark Terry chronology
Back in Bean's Bag (1962)	3 in Jazz (1963)	More (1963)

Professional ratings
Review scores
Source	Rating
Allmusic	4/5 stars

3 in Jazz is an album released on the RCA label which features tracks from three separate sessions by vibraphonist Gary Burton's Quartet, Sonny Rollins & Co. and the Clark Terry Quintet recorded in 1963.

== Reception ==
The Allmusic review by Scott Yanow awarded the album 4 stars, stating, "three unrelated but consistently interesting sessions... Well worth picking up".

== Track listing ==
No.	Title	Writer(s)	Length
1.	"Hello, Young Lovers"	Oscar Hammerstein II, Richard Rodgers	2:54
2.	"Gentle Wind and Falling Tear"	Gary Burton	2:52
3.	"You Are My Lucky Star"	Nacio Herb Brown, Arthur Freed	3:40
4.	"I Could Write a Book"	Lorenz Hart, Richard Rodgers	3:10
5.	"Sounds of the Night"	Gerald Fried, Johnny Mercer	2:58
6.	"Cielito Lindo"	Traditional	2:25
7.	"Stella by Starlight"	Ned Washington, Victor Young	3:08
8.	"Blue Comedy"	Michael Gibbs	2:56
9.	"There Will Never Be Another You"	Mack Gordon, Harry Warren	5:34
10.	"Blues Tonight"	Clark Terry	2:29
11.	"When My Dreamboat Comes Home"	Dave Franklin, Cliff Friend	2:29

- Gary Burton Quartet recorded in Los Angeles, California on February 14, 1963 (tracks 1, 2, 7 & 8)
- Sonny Rollins & Co. recorded in New York, New York on February 20, 1963 (tracks 3, 4 & 9)
- Clark Terry Quintet recorded in New York, New York on March 11, 1963 (tracks 5, 6, 10 & 11)

== Personnel ==
Gary Burton Quartet (tracks 1, 2, 7 & 8)

- Gary Burton — vibraphone
- Jack Sheldon — trumpet
- Monty Budwig — bass
- Vernel Fournier — drums

Sonny Rollins & Co. (tracks 3, 4 & 9)

- Sonny Rollins — tenor saxophone
- Don Cherry — cornet
- Henry Grimes — bass
- Billy Higgins — drums

Clark Terry Quintet (tracks 5, 6, 10 & 11)

- Clark Terry — trumpet, flugelhorn
- Hank Jones — piano
- Milt Hinton — bass
- Osie Johnson — drums
- Kenny Burrell — guitar
- Willie Rodriguez — bongos, conga (added on tracks 5 & 11)
