= David Lee (drummer) =

American jazz drummer and composer (1941–2021)

- Born: January 4, 1941; New Orleans, Louisiana, U.S.
- Died: August 4, 2021 (aged 80) New Orleans, Louisiana, U.S.
- Genres: Jazz
- Instrument: Drums

David Lee Jr. (January 4, 1941 – August 4, 2021) was an American jazz drummer and composer.

== Early life ==
Lee was born in New Orleans on January 4, 1941. He played professionally from his early teens, and was a member of bands in the United States Army.

== Career ==
In 1969, Lee co-founded the New Orleans Jazz Workshop. Dizzy Gillespie brought Lee into his band in 1969; soon after he worked with Roy Ayers (1971) and Sonny Rollins (1972–1975). Lee then formed a quartet and continued to work as a sideman.

Ethan Iverson wrote that Lee in recordings by Rollins in the 1970s was "swinging hard in a traditional manner but also perfect for all the varied grooves embraced by '70's jazz".

== Personal life ==
He died on August 4, 2021.

== Discography ==
=== As sideman ===
With Yoshiaki Masuo

- 111 Sullivan St. (1975)

With Sonny Rollins

- Next Album (Milestone, 1972)
- Horn Culture (Milestone, 1973)
- Sonny Rollins in Japan (Victor, 1973)
- The Cutting Edge (Milestone, 1974)
- First Moves (Jazz Door, 1974)

With Charlie Rouse

- Two Is One (1974)

With Lonnie Liston Smith

- Astral Traveling (Flying Dutchman, 1973)

With Richard Wyands

- Then, Here, and Now (Jazzcraft, 1978)
