= Sonny, Please =

2006 studio album by Sonny Rollins

Studio album by Sonny Rollins
- Released: 2006
- Recorded: December 20 & 21, 2005, January 13, February 9 & 10, 2006
- Studio: Carriage House Studios, Stamford, Connecticut
- Genre: Jazz
- Length: 54:27
- Label: Doxy
- Producer: Sonny Rollins; Clifton Anderson

Sonny Rollins chronology
Without a Song: The 9/11 Concert (2004)	Sonny, Please (2006)	Road Shows, Vol. 1 (2008)

Sonny, Please is a studio album by jazz saxophonist Sonny Rollins released in 2006 on Doxy Records and the last released during his lifetime. This album peaked at No. 7 on the US Billboard Top Contemporary Jazz Albums chart and No. 12 on the US Billboard Top Jazz Albums chart.

== Background ==
Sonny, Please features performances by Rollins, trombonist Clifton Anderson, guitarist Bobby Broom, bassist Bob Cranshaw, drummers Steve Jordan and Joe Corsello, and percussionist Kimati Dinizulu. This album marked Rollins' final studio session before his retirement in 2012. Its title references an exasperated expression often used by Rollins' wife Lucille.

== Critical reception ==
Professional ratings
Review scores
Source	Rating
AllMusic	3.5/5 stars

The AllMusic review by Jeff Tamarkin awarded the album 3.5 stars, stating: "Most of his playing here is relatively easygoing. Rollins still enjoys taking it to the limit, just not as often as he once did. He doesn't need to, though; with nothing left to prove, he can afford to stand back and just enjoy being Sonny Rollins."

== Track listing ==
All compositions by Sonny Rollins except as indicated

1. "Sonny, Please" - 7:59
2. "Someday I'll Find You" (Noël Coward) - 9:53
3. "Nishi" - 7:52
4. "Stairway to the Stars" - (Matty Malneck, Mitchell Parish, Frank Signorelli) - 5:14
5. "Remembering Tommy" - 7:42
6. "Serenade (Ballet Les Millions d'Arlequin)" (Riccardo Drigo, Mario) - 8:18
7. "Park Palace Parade" - 7:29

== Personnel ==
- Sonny Rollins – tenor saxophone
- Clifton Anderson – trombone
- Bobby Broom – guitar
- Bob Cranshaw – electric and acoustic bass
- Steve Jordan – drums
- Kimati Dinizulu – percussion
- Joe Corsello – drums
