= The Way I Feel (Sonny Rollins album) =

1976 studio album by Sonny Rollins

Studio album by Sonny Rollins
- Released: 1976
- Recorded: August–October 1976
- Studio: Fantasy Studios (Berkeley, California); Total Experience Recording Studios (Hollywood, California)
- Genre: Jazz
- Length: 36:55
- Label: Milestone
- Producer: Orrin Keepnews

Sonny Rollins chronology
Nucleus (1975)	The Way I Feel (1976)	Easy Living (1977)

The Way I Feel is a studio album by jazz saxophonist Sonny Rollins, released on the Milestone label in 1976, featuring performances by Rollins with Patrice Rushen, Lee Ritenour, Billy Cobham, and Bill Summers with a brass section added on five tracks.

== Reception ==
Professional ratings
Review scores
Source	Rating
AllMusic	2/5 stars
The Rolling Stone Jazz Record Guide	1/5 stars
The Penguin Guide to Jazz Recordings	1.5/4 stars

The AllMusic review by Scott Yanow calls the album "One of Sonny Rollins' lesser sets of the 1970s".

== Track listing ==
All compositions by Sonny Rollins except where noted.

1. "Island Lady" – 5:51
2. "Asfrantation Woogie" – 3:14
3. "Love Reborn" (George Duke, Flora Purim) – 5:13
4. "Happy Feel" – 3:53
5. "Shout It Out" (Patrice Rushen) – 5:45
6. "The Way I Feel About You" (Duke) – 5:34
7. "Charm Baby" – 7:25

== Personnel ==
- Sonny Rollins – tenor saxophone
- Patrice Rushen – piano, electric piano, clavinet, synthesizer
- Lee Ritenour – guitar
- Billy Cobham – drums
- Bill Summers – conga, percussion
- Oscar Brashear – trumpet (tracks 1–2; 4–6)
- Gene Coe – trumpet (tracks 1–2; 4–6)
- Chuck Findley – trumpet (tracks 1–2; 4–6)
- George Bohanon – trombone (tracks 1–2; 4–6)
- Lew McCreary – trombone (tracks 1–2; 4–6)
- Alan Robinson – French horn (tracks 1–2; 4–6)
- Marilyn Robinson – French horn (tracks 1–2; 4–6)
- Don Waldrop – tuba (tracks 1–2; 4–6)
- Bill Green – piccolo, flute, soprano saxophone (tracks 1–2; 4–6)
- Alex Blake – bass (tracks 3, 6; 7)
- Charles Meeks – electric bass (tracks 1–2; 4–5)
- Recorded at Fantasy Studios, Berkeley, California, August–October, 1976
