= There Will Never Be Another You (album) =

1978 live album by Sonny Rollins, recorded 1965

Live album by Sonny Rollins
- Released: 1978
- Recorded: June 17, 1965
- Venue: Museum of Modern Art, New York City
- Genre: Jazz
- Length: 34:17
- Label: Impulse!
- Producer: Bob Thiele, Michael Cuscuna

Sonny Rollins chronology
The Standard Sonny Rollins (1964)	There Will Never Be Another You (1978)	Sonny Rollins on Impulse! (1965)

There Will Never Be Another You is a live album by jazz saxophonist Sonny Rollins, recorded at the Museum of Modern Art in New York City on June 17, 1965, and released on the Impulse! label in 1978, featuring a performance by Rollins with Tommy Flanagan, Bob Cranshaw, Billy Higgins and Mickey Roker.

== Reception ==
Professional ratings
Review scores
Source	Rating
AllMusic	2/5 stars
Christgau's Record Guide	A
The Rolling Stone Jazz Record Guide	4/5 stars

The AllMusic review by Scott Yanow states: "Rollins was in a strolling mood and he wanders all over the stage which means that he is off-mic much of the time. His playing on these five standards (which includes a 16-minute version of the title tune) is fine, but the erratic recording quality makes this one of the lesser Rollins albums." Music critic Robert Christgau praised the album, writing of the title track: "The man is expansive here, too—casually interpolating rapt modal runs into his thoughtful thematic improvisations on the 16-minute title tour de force..."

== Track listing ==
1. "On Green Dolphin Street" (Bronislaw Kaper, Ned Washington) – 7:22
2. "Three Little Words" (Bert Kalmar, Harry Ruby) – 9:13
3. "Mademoiselle De Paris" (Henri Contet, Paul Durand, Eric Maschwitz, Mitchell Parish) – 1:47
4. "To a Wild Rose" (Edward MacDowell) – 5:54
5. "There Will Never Be Another You" (Mack Gordon, Harry Warren) – 16:40

== Personnel ==
- Sonny Rollins – tenor saxophone
- Tommy Flanagan – piano
- Bob Cranshaw – bass
- Mickey Roker – drums
- Billy Higgins – drums
