= Two Is One (Charlie Rouse album) =

Studio album by Charles Rouse
- Released: 1974
- Recorded: 1974; The Warehouse, New York City
- Genre: Jazz
- Length: 40:14
- Labels: Strata-East; SES 19746
- Producer: Cha-Rou Inc.

Charles Rouse chronology
Bossa Nova Bacchanal (1960)	Two Is One (1974)	Cinnamon Flower (1977)

Two Is One is an album by American saxophonist Charles Rouse recorded in 1974 and released on the Strata-East label.

== Reception ==
Professional ratings
Review scores
Source	Rating
AllMusic	4/5 stars
The Encyclopedia of Popular Music	4/5 stars
MusicHound Jazz	3/5 stars
The Penguin Guide to Jazz	3/4 stars

The editors of AllMusic awarded the album 4 stars, and reviewer Brandon Burke stated: "Given his discography, this record is atypical and probably not for everyone, but enjoyable nonetheless".

The authors of The Penguin Guide to Jazz Recordings called the music "pretty startling," and commented: "It's a difficult performance to locate within Rouse's overall output, but there is no denying its effectiveness."

A writer for Billboard remarked: "this is an appreciated release and shows another side of Rouse, as it presents him in a funky feeling."

Guitarist Jeff Parker wrote: "This album introduced me to Strata-East Records, and I've been... following the label and collecting the records ever since."

== Track listing ==
1. "Bitchin'" (George Davis) - 7:19
2. "Hopscotch" (Joe Chambers) - 7:18
3. "In a Funky Way" (Davis) - 4:52
4. "Two Is One" (Charles Rouse, Roland Hanna) - 11:16
5. "In His Presence Searching" (David Lee) - 9:29

== Personnel ==
- Charles Rouse - tenor saxophone, bass clarinet
- George Davis (tracks 1, 3 & 5), Paul Metzke - guitar
- Calo Scott - cello
- Martin Rivera (tracks 1 & 3), Stanley Clarke (tracks 2, 4 & 5) - bass
- David Lee - drums
- Azzedin Weston - congas (tracks 1 & 3)
- Airto Moreira - percussion (tracks 2, 4 & 5)
