= Alfie (Sonny Rollins album) =

1966 soundtrack album by Sonny Rollins

Soundtrack album by Sonny Rollins
- Released: 1966
- Recorded: January 26, 1966
- Studio: Van Gelder Studio (Englewood Cliffs, NJ)
- Genre: Jazz
- Length: 32:50
- Label: Impulse!
- Producer: Bob Thiele

Sonny Rollins chronology
Sonny Rollins on Impulse! (1965)	Alfie (1966)	East Broadway Run Down (1966)

Official audio
- "Alfie's Theme" on YouTube

Professional ratings
Review scores
Source	Rating
AllMusic	4.5/5 stars
DownBeat	5/5 stars
The Rolling Stone Jazz Record Guide	4/5 stars
The Penguin Guide to Jazz Recordings	3.5/4 stars

Alfie is a 1966 soundtrack album by jazz saxophonist Sonny Rollins, featuring music composed for the 1966 British film of the same name.

Issued on the Impulse! label, the album features performances by Rollins, with Kenny Burrell, Jimmy Cleveland, J. J. Johnson, and Roger Kellaway, arranged and conducted by Oliver Nelson. The original film was made in London and features Rollins with a score recorded with British musicians, including pianist Stan Tracey, who are not heard on this album.

The album reached No. 17 on the Billboard R&B chart. In the UK, the album was originally released in 1966 under the title Sonny Plays Alfie, on the His Master's Voice label (CLP 3529), before resurfacing in 1966 as Alfie on the jazz-based Impulse! label, as in the US.

== Track listing ==
All compositions by Sonny Rollins.

No.	Title	Length
1.	""Alfie's Theme""	10:25 (Note: Track times given are from the original LP; CD track lengths are different, with Alfie's Theme being 9:41 for most CD releases)
2.	""He's Younger Than You Are""	5:07
3.	""Street Runner with Child""	4:00
4.	""Transition Theme for Minor Blues or Little Malcolm Loves His Dad""	5:50
5.	""On Impulse""	5:07
6.	""Alfie's Theme Differently""	3:44
Total length:		32:50

== Personnel ==
- Oliver Nelson – arranger, conductor
- Sonny Rollins – composer, tenor saxophone
- J. J. Johnson – trombone (tracks 1–2)
- Jimmy Cleveland – trombone (tracks 3–6)
- Phil Woods – alto saxophone
- Bob Ashton – tenor saxophone
- Danny Bank – baritone saxophone
- Roger Kellaway – piano
- Kenny Burrell – guitar
- Walter Booker – bass
- Frankie Dunlop – drums

== Charts ==
Chart performance for Alfie
Chart (2025)	Peak position
Greek Albums (IFPI)	21
