= The Cutting Edge (album) =

1974 live album by Sonny Rollins

Live album by Sonny Rollins
- Released: 1974
- Recorded: July 6, 1974
- Genre: Jazz
- Length: 42:35
- Label: Milestone
- Producer: Orrin Keepnews

Sonny Rollins chronology
Sonny Rollins in Japan (1973)	The Cutting Edge (1974)	Nucleus (1975)

The Cutting Edge is a live album by jazz saxophonist Sonny Rollins, recorded at the Montreux Jazz Festival and released on the Milestone label in 1974, featuring performances by Rollins with Stanley Cowell, Yoshiaki Masuo, Bob Cranshaw, David Lee and Mtume with Rufus Harley joining on one track.

== Reception ==
Professional ratings
Review scores
Source	Rating
AllMusic	4/5 stars
Christgau's Record Guide	B
DownBeat	3.5/5 stars
The Penguin Guide to Jazz Recordings	2.5/4 stars

The Allmusic review by Scott Yanow states: "Sonny Rollins' 1974 appearance at the Montreux Jazz Festival was warmly received... Rollins manages to turn such unlikely material as 'To a Wild Rose' and 'A House Is Not a Home' into jazz." Music critic Robert Christgau gave the album a B rating, writing "...although I hoped for belated paydirt from his first live album in years, more careful examination reveals that the straight melodies do get dull and the improvisations aren't rich enough to invite deep digging..."

== Track listing ==
All compositions by Sonny Rollins except where noted.

1. "The Cutting Edge" – 6:50
2. "To a Wild Rose" (Edward MacDowell) – 8:42
3. "First Moves" – 6:58
4. "A House Is Not a Home" – (Burt Bacharach, Hal David) – 5:33
5. "Swing Low, Sweet Chariot" (Traditional) – 14:41

- Recorded at the Montreux Jazz Festival, Switzerland, on July 6, 1974

== Personnel ==
- Sonny Rollins – tenor saxophone
- Stanley Cowell – piano
- Yoshiaki Masuo – guitar
- Bob Cranshaw – electric bass
- David Lee – drums
- Mtume – congas
- Rufus Harley – bagpipes (track 5)
