= Don't Ask (Sonny Rollins album) =

1979 studio album by Sonny Rollins

Studio album by Sonny Rollins
- Released: 1979
- Recorded: May 15–18, 1979
- Studio: Fantasy Studios, Berkeley, CA
- Genre: Jazz
- Length: 38:16
- Label: Milestone
- Producer: Orrin Keepnews

Sonny Rollins chronology
| Don't Stop the Carnival (1978) | Don't Ask (1979) | Love at First Sight (1980) |

Don't Ask is a studio album by jazz saxophonist Sonny Rollins, released on the Milestone label in 1979 and featuring performances by Rollins with Mark Soskin, Larry Coryell, Jerome Harris, Al Foster, and Bill Summers.

== Reception ==
Professional ratings
Review scores
| Source | Rating |
|---|---|
| AllMusic | 2.5/5 stars |
| DownBeat | 3/5 stars |
| The Penguin Guide to Jazz Recordings | 3/4 stars |
| The Rolling Stone Jazz Record Guide | 3/5 stars |

The San Francisco Examiner called the album "a joyful and compelling set," writing that "Coryell's insistent rhythmic drive and bluesy underpinnings prove to be a perfect foil for Rollins."

The AllMusic review by Scott Yanow states: "A bit erratic, this album is still worth acquiring for its stronger moments."

== Track listing ==
All compositions by Sonny Rollins except where noted.

1. "Harlem Boys" – 7:06
2. "The File" (Larry Coryell) – 4:14
3. "Disco Monk" – 7:45
4. "My Ideal" (Newell Chase, Leo Robin, Richard A. Whiting) – 3:41
5. "Don't Ask" – 4:27
6. "Tai-Chi" – 4:49
7. "And Then My Love I Found You" – 6:14

== Personnel ==
- Sonny Rollins – tenor saxophone, lyricon, piano
- Mark Soskin – piano, electric piano, synthesizer (tracks 1, 3; 5–7)
- Larry Coryell – electric guitar (tracks 2–5; 7)
- Jerome Harris – electric bass (tracks 1, 3; 5–7)
- Al Foster – drums (tracks 1, 3; 5–7)
- Bill Summers – congas, percussion (tracks 1, 3; 5–7)
