= Reel Life (Sonny Rollins album) =

1982 studio album by Sonny Rollins

Studio album by Sonny Rollins
- Released: 1982
- Recorded: August 17–22, 1982
- Studio: Fantasy Studios, Berkeley, CA
- Genre: Jazz
- Label: Milestone
- Producer: Sonny Rollins, Lucille Rollins

Sonny Rollins chronology
No Problem (1981)	Reel Life (1982)	Sunny Days, Starry Nights (1984)

Reel Life is a studio album by jazz saxophonist Sonny Rollins, released on the Milestone label in 1982, featuring performances by Rollins with Bobby Broom, Yoshiaki Masuo, Bob Cranshaw and Jack DeJohnette.

== Reception ==
Professional ratings
Review scores
Source	Rating
Allmusic	3.5/5 stars
The Rolling Stone Jazz Record Guide	2/5 stars

The Allmusic review by Michael G. Nastos states: "As the career of Rollins moved into fourth gear, his love for hard bop, Caribbean music, and funkier styles continued to appeal to die-hard fans and the urban crowd. A matchless melodic tenor saxophone, Rollins just kept rolling along."

== Track listing ==
All compositions by Sonny Rollins except where noted.

1. "Reel Life" – 6:14
2. "McGhee" (Howard McGhee, Sonny Rollins) – 4:20
3. "Rosita's Best Friend" – 6:22
4. "Sonny Side Up" (Yoshiaki Masuo) – 6:47
5. "My Little Brown Book" (Billy Strayhorn) – 3:55
6. "Best Wishes" – 5:43
7. "Solo Reprise (Sonny)" – 2:12

== Personnel ==
- Sonny Rollins – tenor saxophone
- Bobby Broom – guitar
- Yoshiaki Masuo – guitar, electric guitar, claves
- Bob Cranshaw – electric bass, cabasa
- Jack DeJohnette – drums, congas, maracas
