= Why Was I Born? =

1929 song by Jerome Kern and Oscar Hammerstein II

Single by Helen Morgan
- B-side: "Don't Ever Leave Me"
- Written: 1929
- Published: 1929 T.B. Harms, Inc., Universal Polygram International Publishing, Inc.
- Released: January 20, 1930
- Recorded: October 16, 1929 take 2
- Studio: New York City
- Venue: Sweet Adeline (1929 Broadway musical)
- Genre: Show tune, Popular Music
- Length: 3.22
- Label: Victor 22199
- Composer: Jerome Kern
- Lyricist: Oscar Hammerstein II

"Why Was I Born?" is a 1929 song composed by Jerome Kern, with lyrics written by Oscar Hammerstein II.

It was written for the show Sweet Adeline (1929) and introduced by Helen Morgan. Popular recordings in 1930 were by Helen Morgan and by Libby Holman.

== Notable recordings ==
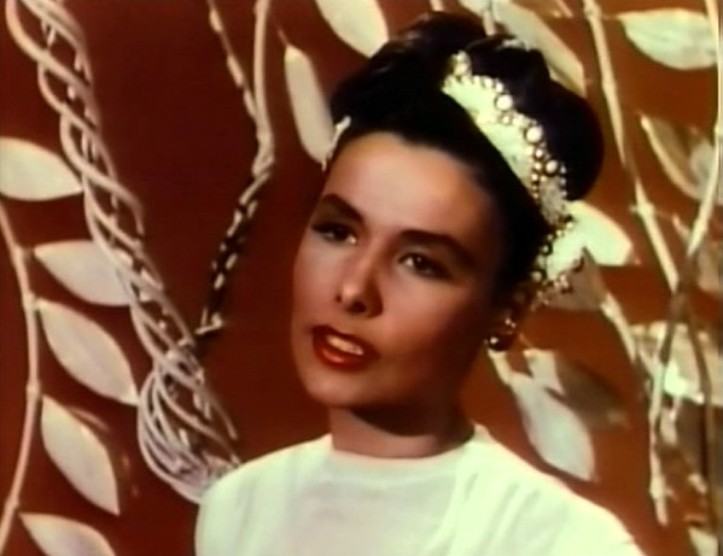
Horne singing "Why Was I Born?" in Till the Clouds Roll By (1946)

- Billie Holiday - recorded the song for Brunswick Records (catalog No. 7859) on January 25, 1937 with Teddy Wilson and His Orchestra.
- Lena Horne in the film Till the Clouds Roll By (1946)
- Frank Sinatra recorded the song for Columbia Records on December 28, 1947.
- Vic Damone reached No. 20 in the Billboard charts in 1949 with the song.
- Dorothy Lamour - The Road to Romance...For Bing, Bob and You! (1957).
- Judy Garland - The London Sessions (1960)
- Margaret Whiting - Margaret Whiting Sings the Jerome Kern Songbook (1960)
- Kenny Burrell and John Coltrane - Kenny Burrell and John Coltrane (1963)
- Ella Fitzgerald - Ella Fitzgerald Sings the Jerome Kern Songbook (1963)
- Dinah Washington - for her album Dinah '63 (1963).
- Georgia Brown - Georgia Brown (The Sensational New Singing Star of Oliver!) (1963).
- Cher - Bittersweet White Light (1973)
- Sonny Rollins - Without a Song: The 9/11 Concert (2005)
- Bob Dylan - Triplicate (2017)
