= Love at First Sight (Sonny Rollins album) =

1980 studio album by Sonny Rollins

Studio album by Sonny Rollins
- Released: 1980
- Recorded: May 9–12, 1980
- Studio: Fantasy Studios, Berkeley, CA
- Genre: Jazz
- Label: Milestone
- Producer: Orrin Keepnews

Sonny Rollins chronology
Don't Ask (1979)	Love at First Sight (1980)	No Problem (1981)

Love at First Sight is a studio album by jazz saxophonist Sonny Rollins, released on the Milestone label in 1980, featuring performances by Rollins with George Duke, Stanley Clarke, Al Foster and Bill Summers.

== Reception ==
Professional ratings
Review scores
Source	Rating
AllMusic	3/5 stars
The Penguin Guide to Jazz Recordings	3/4 stars
The Rolling Stone Jazz Record Guide	3/5 stars

The AllMusic review by Scott Yanow states: "Decent music but nothing that memorable occurs."

== Track listing ==
All compositions by Sonny Rollins except where noted.

1. "Little Lu" – 6:38
2. "The Dream That We Fell Out of" (Stanley Clarke) – 4:14
3. "Strode Rode" – 7:33
4. "The Very Thought of You" (Ray Noble) – 5:38
5. "Caress" (George Duke) – 7:25
6. "Double Feature" (Clarke, Rollins) – 4:51

== Personnel ==
- Sonny Rollins – tenor saxophone, lyricon
- George Duke – piano, electric piano
- Stanley Clarke – electric bass
- Al Foster – drums (tracks 1–3 & 5)
- Bill Summers – congas, percussion (tracks 1 & 5)

== See also ==
- Love at first sight
