= No Problem (Sonny Rollins album) =

1982 studio album by Sonny Rollins

Studio album by Sonny Rollins
- Released: 1982
- Recorded: December 9–15, 1981
- Studio: Fantasy, Berkeley, CA
- Genre: Jazz
- Length: 36:12
- Label: Milestone
- Producer: Sonny Rollins, Lucille Rollins

Sonny Rollins chronology
Love at First Sight (1980)	No Problem (1982)	Reel Life (1982)

No Problem is a studio album by jazz saxophonist Sonny Rollins, recorded for the Milestone label in 1981, and released in 1982, featuring performances by Rollins with Bobby Broom, Bobby Hutcherson, Bob Cranshaw and Tony Williams.

== Reception ==
Professional ratings
Review scores
Source	Rating
AllMusic	2.5/5 stars
The Rolling Stone Jazz Record Guide	3/5 stars

The Boston Globe wrote: "The calypso-jazz peregrinations of Sonny Rollins and his stalking-horse tenor saxophone are heard again in his current LP, No Problem (Milestone) with special cheers reserved for the title song and his manic mischief on the Dolly Parton hit, 'Here You Come Again'."

The AllMusic review by Scott Yanow states: "Rollins is in generally fine form but none of the compositions are all that inspiring and for these fine players this session sounds too safe and routine."

== Track listing ==
All compositions by Sonny Rollins except where noted.

1. "No Problem" – 7:40
2. "Here You Come Again" (Barry Mann, Cynthia Weil) – 5:32
3. "Jo Jo" (Bobby Hutcherson) – 5:05
4. "Coconut Bread" – 4:22
5. "Penny Saved" (Bobby Broom) – 5:44
6. "Illusions" (Frederick Hollander) – 2:17
7. "Joyous Lake" – 5:32

== Personnel ==
- Sonny Rollins – tenor saxophone
- Bobby Hutcherson – vibes
- Bobby Broom – guitar
- Bob Cranshaw – bass
- Tony Williams – drums
