= Nucleus (Sonny Rollins album) =

1975 studio album by Sonny Rollins

Studio album by Sonny Rollins
- Released: 1975
- Recorded: September 2–5, 1975
- Genre: Jazz
- Length: 41:02
- Label: Milestone
- Producer: Orrin Keepnews

Sonny Rollins chronology
The Cutting Edge (1974)	Nucleus (1975)	The Way I Feel (1976)

Nucleus is a studio album by jazz saxophonist Sonny Rollins, released on the Milestone label in 1975, featuring performances by Rollins with George Duke, Raul de Souza, Bennie Maupin, Chuck Rainey, Eddie Moore, Mtume, Bob Cranshaw and Roy McCurdy. It was recorded at Fantasy Studios, Berkeley, CA, on September 2–5, 1975.

== Reception ==
Professional ratings
Review scores
Source	Rating
AllMusic	2.5/5 stars
Christgau's Record Guide	A−
The Penguin Guide to Jazz Recordings	2/4 stars

The AllMusic review by Scott Yanow states: "This funky date has its moments (including an updated version of "My Reverie") but falls far short of hinting at any new innovations." Music critic Robert Christgau praised the album, writing: "This is as rich an r&b saxophone record as I know, combining repetition and invention, melodies recalled and melodies unimaginable, in proportions that define the difference between selling out and reaching out.... If you really believe you don't like 'jazz,' this is as good a place to start as any."

== Track listing ==
All compositions by Sonny Rollins except where noted.

1. "Lucille" – 6:08
2. "Gwaligo" – 5:58
3. "Are You Ready?" – 4:08
4. "Azalea" – 4:46
5. "Newkleus" (James Mtume) – 5:17
6. "Cosmet" – 7:20
7. "My Reverie" (Larry Clinton, based on Claude Debussy's "Reverie") – 7:39

== Personnel ==
- Sonny Rollins – tenor saxophone, soprano saxophone
- George Duke – piano, electric piano and synthesizer (tracks: 1, 3, 5–7)
- Raul de Souza – trombone (tracks 1–4, 6, 7)
- Bennie Maupin – tenor saxophone (all tracks), tenor saxophone soloist (4), bass clarinet (7), saxello (6), lyricon (5)
- Blackbyrd McKnight – guitar (tracks: 1–3, 5, 6); soloist 2, 3)
- David Amaro – guitar; soloist (1)
- Chuck Rainey – electric bass (tracks: 1–3, 6)
- Bob Cranshaw – electric bass (tracks: 4, 5, 7)
- Eddie Moore – drums (tracks: 1–3, 6)
- Roy McCurdy – drums (tracks: 4, 5, 7)
- Mtume – congas and percussion (tracks: 1–4, 6), lead guitar (5)
