= Horn Culture =

1973 studio album by Sonny Rollins

Studio album by Sonny Rollins
- Released: 1973
- Recorded: April–July 1973
- Genre: Jazz
- Length: 47:40
- Label: Milestone
- Producer: Orrin Keepnews

Sonny Rollins chronology
Next Album (1972)	Horn Culture (1973)	Sonny Rollins in Japan (1973)

Professional ratings
Review scores
Source	Rating
AllMusic	3/5 stars
DownBeat	2.5/5 stars
The Rolling Stone Jazz Record Guide	2/5 stars
The Penguin Guide to Jazz Recordings	2/4 stars

Horn Culture is a 1973 studio album by jazz saxophonist Sonny Rollins, his second to be released on the Milestone label. It features performances by Rollins with Walter Davis Jr., Yoshiaki Masuo, Bob Cranshaw, David Lee, and Mtume.

== Reception ==
The AllMusic review by Scott Yanow states: "a decent effort... Nothing too essential occurs but the music is generally enjoyable."

== Track listing ==
All compositions by Sonny Rollins, except where noted.

1. "Pictures in the Reflection of a Golden Horn" – 4:47
2. "Sais" (Mtume) – 11:47
3. "Notes for Eddie" – 7:49
4. "God Bless the Child" (Arthur Herzog Jr., Billie Holiday) – 5:37
5. "Love Man" – 9:22
6. "Good Morning Heartache" (Ervin Drake, Dan Fisher, Irene Higginbotham) – 8:18

== Personnel ==
- Sonny Rollins – tenor saxophone (all tracks), soprano saxophone (track 2)
- Walter Davis Jr. – piano (tracks 1, 3-6), electric piano (track 2)
- Yoshiaki Masuo – guitar
- Bob Cranshaw – electric bass
- David Lee – drums
- Mtume – percussion (tracks 1, 3-5), piano (track 2)
- Recorded in NYC and Berkeley, CA, April–July 1973.
