= Easy Living (Sonny Rollins album) =

1977 studio album by Sonny Rollins

Studio album by Sonny Rollins
- Released: 1977
- Recorded: August 3–6, 1977
- Studio: Fantasy Studios, Berkeley, CA
- Genre: Jazz
- Label: Milestone
- Producer: Orrin Keepnews

Sonny Rollins chronology
The Way I Feel (1976)	Easy Living (1977)	Don't Stop the Carnival (1978)

Easy Living is a studio album by jazz saxophonist Sonny Rollins, released on the Milestone label in 1977, featuring performances by Rollins with George Duke, Paul Jackson and Tony Williams with Byron Miller and Bill Summers added on one track.

== Reception ==
Professional ratings
Review scores
Source	Rating
AllMusic	4/5 stars
The Penguin Guide to Jazz Recordings	3/4 stars
The Rolling Stone Jazz Record Guide	4/5 stars

The AllMusic review by Scott Yanow states: "One of Sonny Rollins' better recordings of the 1970s, this spirited Milestone set finds the veteran tenor saxman adopting a thicker and raunchier R&B-ish tone."

== Track listing ==
All compositions by Sonny Rollins, except where noted.

1. "Isn't She Lovely?" (Stevie Wonder) – 6:39
2. "Down the Line" – 7:59
3. "My One and Only Love" (Robert Mellin, Guy Wood) – 5:05
4. "Arroz con Pollo" – 5:37
5. "Easy Living" (Ralph Rainger, Leo Robin) – 6:09
6. "Hear What I'm Saying" – 9:40

== Personnel ==
- Sonny Rollins – tenor saxophone (tracks 1, 5, 6), soprano saxophone (tracks 2, 3, 4)
- George Duke – piano, electric piano
- Tony Williams – drums
- Paul Jackson – electric bass (tracks 2–6)
- Charles Icarus Johnson – guitar (tracks 1–4, 6)
- Byron Miller – electric bass (track 1)
- Bill Summers – congas (track 1)
