= East Broadway Run Down =

1967 studio album by Sonny Rollins

Studio album by Sonny Rollins
- Released: January 1967
- Recorded: May 9, 1966
- Studio: Van Gelder Studio (Englewood Cliffs, NJ)
- Genre: Post-bop, free jazz
- Length: 38:37
- Label: Impulse!
- Producer: Bob Thiele

Sonny Rollins chronology
Alfie (1966)	East Broadway Run Down (1967)	Next Album (1972)

Professional ratings
Review scores
Source	Rating
AllMusic	5/5 stars
DownBeat	5/5 stars
The Rolling Stone Jazz Record Guide	3/5 stars
The Penguin Guide to Jazz Recordings	3.5/4 stars

East Broadway Run Down is a 1966 album by jazz tenor saxophonist Sonny Rollins, released in 1967 by Impulse!. It was his last album before a six-year hiatus. The album is one of his notable experiments with free jazz, with The New Grove Dictionary of Jazz noting it illustrates "the furthest extent to which he incorporated noise elements into his playing". It has been critically described as among his 1960s "jewels".

Initially released on Impulse! Records, the album has been reissued many times on CD and LP by Impulse!, MCA, Universal International, and GRP.

== Track listing ==
All compositions by Sonny Rollins, except where noted.

1. "East Broadway Run Down" – 20:27
2. "Blessing in Disguise" – 12:27
3. "We Kiss in a Shadow" (Oscar Hammerstein II, Richard Rodgers) – 5:40

== Personnel ==
Musicians

- Sonny Rollins – tenor saxophone
- Freddie Hubbard – trumpet (track 1)
- Jimmy Garrison – bass
- Elvin Jones – drums

Production

- Bob Thiele – producer, photography
- Rudy Van Gelder – engineer
- Nat Hentoff – liner notes
- Charles Stewart – photography, cover photo
- Robert Flynn – cover design
- Joe Lebow – liner design
- Mel Cheren – artwork, cover painting
- Vartan – art direction
- Viceroy – artwork
- DZN – repackaging design
