= Sonny Rollins, Vol. 2 =

Studio album by Sonny Rollins
- Released: October 1957
- Recorded: April 14, 1957
- Studios: Van Gelder, Hackensack, New Jersey
- Genre: Hard bop
- Length: 40:52
- Label: Blue Note
- Producer: Alfred Lion

Sonny Rollins chronology
Way Out West (1957)	Sonny Rollins, Vol. 2 (1957)	The Sound of Sonny (1957)

Professional ratings
Review scores
Source	Rating
AllMusic	4/5 stars
The Penguin Guide to Jazz Recordings	3.5/4 stars
The Rolling Stone Jazz Record Guide	5/5 stars

Sonny Rollins, Vol. 2 is an album by American jazz saxophonist Sonny Rollins, recorded on April 14, 1957, and released on Blue Note Records later that year.

== Recording ==
It is noted for the appearance of pianists Thelonious Monk and Horace Silver, both playing on the Monk composition "Misterioso". Monk also plays on his composition "Reflections", while Silver handles the piano duties on all the other tracks.

== Reissue ==
It was reissued in 1999 as part of the Rudy Van Gelder series, remastering done by the audio engineer, also present on the original recording sessions.

== Legacy ==
British singer-songwriter Joe Jackson paid homage to the album when he mimicked the sleeve for his 1984 album Body and Soul.

== Track listing ==
Side one

1. "Why Don't I?" (Sonny Rollins) – 5:44
2. "Wail March" (Rollins) – 6:11
3. "Misterioso" (Thelonious Monk, Denzil Best) – 9:24

Side two

1. "Reflections" (Monk) – 7:03
2. "You Stepped Out of a Dream" (Nacio Herb Brown, Gus Kahn) – 6:24
3. "Poor Butterfly" (Raymond Hubbell, John Golden) – 6:06

== Personnel ==
Musicians

- Sonny Rollins – tenor saxophone
- Jay Jay Johnson – trombone (except "Reflections")
- Horace Silver (except "Reflections"), Thelonious Monk ("Misterioso", "Reflections") – piano
- Paul Chambers – bass
- Art Blakey – drums

Technical personnel

- Alfred Lion – producer
- Rudy Van Gelder – recording engineer, mastering
- Harold Feinstein – design
- Francis Wolff – photography
- Robert Levin – liner notes

== Charts ==
Chart performance for Sonny Rollins, Vol. 2
Chart (2026)	Peak position
UK Jazz & Blues Albums (Official Charts)	15
