= Don't Stop the Carnival (Sonny Rollins album) =

1978 live album by Sonny Rollins

Live album by Sonny Rollins
- Released: 1978
- Recorded: April 13–15, 1978
- Venue: Great American Music Hall, San Francisco, CA
- Genre: Jazz
- Length: 69:31
- Label: Milestone
- Producer: Orrin Keepnews

Sonny Rollins chronology
Easy Living (1977)	Don't Stop the Carnival (1978)	Don't Ask (1979)

Don't Stop the Carnival is a live album by jazz saxophonist Sonny Rollins, recorded at the Great American Music Hall and released on the Milestone label in 1978, featuring performances by Rollins with Mark Soskin, Aurell Ray, Jerome Harris and Tony Williams with Donald Byrd joining on five tracks.

== Reception ==
Professional ratings
Review scores
Source	Rating
AllMusic	3/5 stars
Christgau's Record Guide	A−
The Penguin Guide to Jazz Recordings	2.5/4 stars
The Rolling Stone Jazz Record Guide	4/5 stars

The AllMusic review by Scott Yanow wrote that the "versions of 'Don't Stop the Carnival' and 'Autumn Nocturne' are memorable but most of the rest of the set, although spirited, is a bit lightweight". Music critic Robert Christgau wrote that "the meat of the album is sustaining if not exquisite, jazz food that anyone can digest."

== Track listing ==
All compositions by Sonny Rollins, except where noted.

1. "Don't Stop the Carnival" (Traditional) – 8:46
2. "Silver City" – 8:08
3. "Autumn Nocturne" (Kim Gannon, Josef Myrow) – 6:36
4. "Camel" – 4:14
5. "Introducing the Performers" – 1:01
6. "Nobody Else But Me" (Oscar Hammerstein II, Jerome Kern) – 6:57
7. "Non-Cents" (Toney) – 9:25
8. "A Child's Prayer" (Donald Byrd) – 8:05
9. "President Hayes" (Byrd) – 9:49
10. "Sais" (James Mtume) – 7:55

== Personnel ==
- Sonny Rollins – tenor saxophone, soprano saxophone
- Mark Soskin – piano, electric piano
- Aurell Ray – electric guitar
- Jerome Harris – electric bass
- Tony Williams – drums
- Donald Byrd – trumpet, flugelhorn (tracks 5–10)
