= The Sound of Sonny =

1957 studio album by Sonny Rollins

Studio album by Sonny Rollins
- Released: November 1957
- Recorded: June 11, 12, and 19, 1957
- Studio: Reeves Sound Studios, New York City
- Genre: Jazz
- Length: 32:37
- Label: Riverside
- Producer: Orrin Keepnews

Sonny Rollins chronology
Sonny Rollins, Vol. 2 (1957)	The Sound of Sonny (1957)	Newk's Time (1957)

The Sound of Sonny is a 1957 album by jazz saxophonist Sonny Rollins, his first recorded for the Riverside label, featuring performances by Rollins with Sonny Clark, Roy Haynes, and Percy Heath or Paul Chambers.

== Reception ==
Professional ratings
Review scores
Source	Rating
AllMusic	4.5/5 stars
The Penguin Guide to Jazz Recordings	3.5/4 stars
The Rolling Stone Jazz Record Guide	4/5 stars

The AllMusic review by Lindsay Planer states: "A new phase in Sonny Rollins' career began in 1957. He started what was at the time an almost blasphemous trend of recording for a number of different labels. His pioneering spirit yielded a few genre-defining albums, including this disc. His performances were also at a peak during 1957 as Down Beat magazine proclaimed him the Critics' Poll winner under the category of 'New Star' of the tenor saxophone. This newfound freedom can be heard throughout the innovations on The Sound of Sonny. Not only are Rollins' fluid solos reaching newly obtained zeniths of melodic brilliance, but he has also begun experimenting with alterations in the personnel from tune to tune."

== Track listing ==
All music is composed by Sonny Rollins, except where noted.

No.	Title	Writer(s)	Length
1.	"The Last Time I Saw Paris"	Oscar Hammerstein II; Jerome Kern	2:58
2.	"Just in Time"	Betty Comden; Adolph Green; Jule Styne	3:59
3.	"Toot, Toot, Tootsie, Goodbye"	Ernie Erdman; Ted Fio Rito; Gus Kahn; Robert A. King	4:25
4.	"What Is There to Say?"	Vernon Duke; E.Y. "Yip" Harburg	4:56
5.	"Dearly Beloved"	Jerome Kern; Johnny Mercer	3:05
6.	"Ev'ry Time We Say Goodbye"	Cole Porter	3:23
7.	"Cutie"		5:54
8.	"It Could Happen to You"	Johnny Burke; Jimmy Van Heusen	3:47
9.	"Mangoes"	Dale Libby; Sid Wayne	5:34
10.	"Funky Hotel Blues" (Bonus track on CD reissue)		6:00
Total length:			44:01

== Personnel ==
- Sonny Rollins – tenor saxophone
- Sonny Clark – piano (except tracks 1, 8)
- Percy Heath – bass (tracks 2–3, 5–7, 9)
- Paul Chambers – bass (tracks 1, 4, 10)
- Roy Haynes – drums (except track 8)

Technical

- Orrin Keepnews – producer
- Reid Miles – design
- Francis Wolff – photography
