= Road Shows, Vol. 1 =

2008 live album by Sonny Rollins

Live album by Sonny Rollins
- Released: 2008
- Genre: Jazz
- Label: Doxy/EmArcy
- Producer: Clifton Anderson

Sonny Rollins chronology
| Sonny, Please (2006) | Road Shows, Vol. 1 (2008) | Road Shows, Vol. 2 (2011) |

Road Shows, Vol. 1 is a live album by the American saxophonist Sonny Rollins, released in 2008 via Doxy/EmArcy Records. It was the first volume in a series of Rollins live Road Shows recordings. The tracks, recorded between 1980 and 2007, came from the archives of Rollins and from recordings by enthusiast Carl Smith. The album peaked at No. 3 on Billboard's Jazz Albums chart. It was released around the same time as a DVD, Sonny Rollins in Vienne.

== Production ==
The version of "Some Enchanted Evening" was taken from a 2007 performance. "Easy Living" was recorded in 1980 in Warsaw. "Best Wishes", from 1986, was recorded in Japan. "Nice Lady" was recorded at Victoria, British Columbia's Royal Theatre. Rollins had been including in sets for more than 50 years a version of "More Than You Know". Trombonist Clifton Anderson appeared on the majority of the tracks; he also produced the album. Al Foster was Rollins's most used drummer.

== Critical reception ==
Professional ratings
Review scores
| Source | Rating |
|---|---|
| AllMusic | 4.5/5 stars |
| Robert Christgau | A+ |
| The Gazette | 4/5 |
| The Guardian | 4/5 stars |

The Democrat and Chronicle stated: "It says a lot about Sonny Rollins' ability and physical stamina that he can release a collection of live recordings, captured over three decades, and show little or no drop-off in power and inventiveness as he ages from his early 50s into his late 70s." The News & Observer praised the "twisting, punching, hard-edged turn" of the cadenza on "Easy Living". The Winnipeg Free Press wrote that each song "is a gem that confirms that Rollins onstage in full improvisatory flight is one of the ultimate jazz experiences." The New York Times deemed the album "a bonanza for admirers of latter-day Rollins (and perhaps a rejoinder to those who still pine for the Sonny of yore)."

JazzTimes concluded: "If the Road Shows series maintains the high standard established by this first volume, it is destined to become one of the great live-album projects of jazz, ranking right up there with Miles Davis' Plugged Nickel sets and Coltrane's Village Vanguard recordings." Robert Christgau determined that Rollins's "tenor sound [has] grown huge and warm without a hint of corn syrup ... his astonishing cadenzas and unaccompanied improvs are the most generous kind of high shtick." The Wall Street Journal noted that Rollins's "intensity of focus, the depth and breadth of his musical references (revealed through both direct quotation and subtle implication), and the sheer visceral pleasures he offers during a solo are simply unmatched." The Courier-Mail listed Road Shows, Vol. 1 as the best jazz album of 2008.

== Track listing ==
| No. | Title | Length |
|---|---|---|
| 1. | "Best Wishes" |
| 2. | "More Than You Know" |
| 3. | "Blossom" |
| 4. | "Easy Living" |
| 5. | "Tenor Madness" |
| 6. | "Nice Lady" |
| 7. | "Some Enchanted Evening" |
