= Now's the Time (Sonny Rollins album) =

1964 studio album by Sonny Rollins

Studio album by Sonny Rollins
- Released: September 1964
- Recorded: January 20, 1964; February 14, 18, 1964; April 14, 1964
- Genre: Jazz
- Label: RCA Victor
- Producer: George Avakian

Sonny Rollins chronology
Sonny Meets Hawk! (1963)	Now's the Time (1964)	The Standard Sonny Rollins (1965)

Professional ratings
Review scores
Source	Rating
AllMusic	3/5 stars
Record Mirror	3/5 stars

Now's the Time is a 1964 studio album by jazz saxophonist Sonny Rollins, released by RCA Victor featuring performances by Rollins with Herbie Hancock, Thad Jones, Ron Carter, Bob Cranshaw and Roy McCurdy on several bebop tunes.

== Track listing ==
1. "Now's the Time" (Charlie Parker) – 4:06
2. "Blue 'n' Boogie" (Dizzy Gillespie, Frank Paparelli) – 5:32
3. "I Remember Clifford" (Benny Golson) – 2:36
4. "52nd Street Theme" (Thelonious Monk) – 4:33
5. "St. Thomas" (Sonny Rollins) – 3:58
6. "'Round Midnight" (Monk) – 4:02
7. "Afternoon in Paris" (John Lewis) – 2:46
8. "Four" (Miles Davis) – 7:15

CD rerelease bonus tracks

1. "I Remember Clifford" [alternate take] (Golson) – 6:04
2. "52nd Street Theme" [alternate take] (Monk) – 14:41
3. "St. Thomas" [alternate take] (Rollins) – 3:06
4. "Four" [alternate take] (Davis) – 5:53

== Personnel ==
- Sonny Rollins – tenor saxophone
- Herbie Hancock – piano (tracks 1, 4–6, 9 and 12)
- Thad Jones – cornet (tracks 4 and 5)
- Ron Carter – bass (tracks 1, 6–10 and 12)
- Bob Cranshaw – bass (tracks 2–5 and 11)
- Roy McCurdy – drums
- Recorded in New York City on January 20 (tracks 4 and 5), February 14 (tracks 1, 6–9 and 12), 18 (track 10), April 14 (tracks 2, 3 and 11)
