= What's New? (album) =

Studio album by Sonny Rollins
- Released: August 1962
- Recorded: April 5, 25–26, 1962; May 14, 1962
- Genre: Jazz
- Length: 43:26
- Label: RCA Victor
- Producer: George Avakian; Bob Prince

Sonny Rollins chronology
| The Bridge (1962) | What's New? (1962) | Our Man in Jazz (1962) |

What's New? is a 1962 album by jazz saxophonist Sonny Rollins, his second for RCA Victor featuring performances by Rollins with Jim Hall, Bob Cranshaw, Ben Riley, Dennis Charles, Frank Charles, Willie Rodriguez and Candido. The cover illustration was by Mike Ludlow.

== Reception ==
Professional ratings
Review scores
| Source | Rating |
|---|---|
| AllMusic | 4.5/5 stars |
| The Penguin Guide to Jazz Recordings | 3/4 stars |

The AllMusic review by Scott Yanow states: "This underrated music is well worth an extensive search."

== Re-issue ==
In 1978, RCA reissued this album under the title Pure Gold Jazz (ANL1-2809) with the same track listing. Otherwise What's New remained the title throughout its release history. In 1993, What's New was first released digitally mastered on CD, despite its short running time without any additional tracks. A year later BMG France reissued the album with both alternative opening tracks.

== Track listing ==
All compositions by Sonny Rollins except where noted.

1. "If Ever I Would Leave You" (Alan Jay Lerner, Frederick Loewe) – 11:58
2. "Jungoso" – 10:51
3. "Bluesongo" – 4:41
4. "The Night Has a Thousand Eyes" (Buddy Bernier, Jerry Brainin) – 9:08
5. "Brown Skin Girl" (Norman Span) – 6:48

- Recorded in New York City on April 5 (track 4), 25 (track 1), 26 (track 5) and May 14 (tracks 2 & 3), 1962

Note

- The album was released in the UK (SF 7524 and RD 7524) and in Japan (SHP-5120) with an alternative opening track, "Don't Stop the Carnival", also a Rollins original. (In France and Germany both versions were available.)

== Personnel ==
- Sonny Rollins – tenor saxophone
- Jim Hall – guitar (tracks 1, 4, 5)
- Bob Cranshaw – bass
- Ben Riley – drums (tracks 1, 4, 5)
- Denis Charles – percussion (tracks 1, 4, 5)
- Frank Charles – percussion (tracks 1, 4, 5)
- Willie Rodriguez – percussion (tracks 1, 4, 5)
- Candido – percussion (tracks 2, 3)
