= Bob Cranshaw =

American jazz bassist (1932–2016)

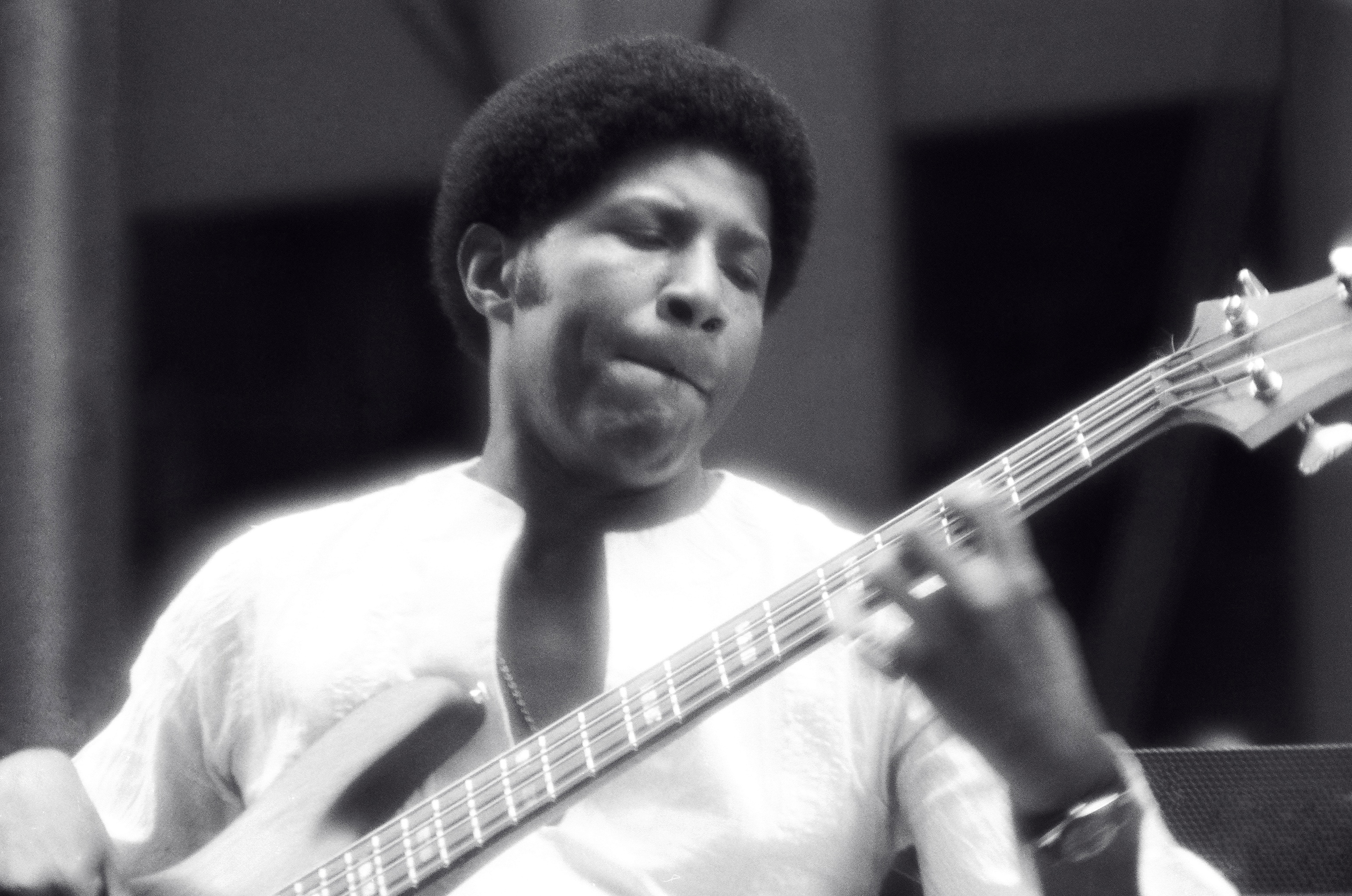
- Cranshaw in 1976

Background information
- Born: Melbourne Robert Cranshaw; December 3, 1932; Chicago, Illinois, US
- Died: November 2, 2016 (aged 83) Manhattan, New York, US
- Genre: Jazz
- Occupation: Musician
- Instruments: Double bass, electric bass
- Formerly of: Sonny Rollins

Melbourne Robert Cranshaw (December 10, 1932 – November 2, 2016) was an American jazz bassist. His career spanned the heyday of Blue Note Records as a house bassist. He is known for his long association with Sonny Rollins, starting with a live appearance at the 1959 Playboy jazz festival in Chicago and Rollins's 1962 album The Bridge.

Cranshaw died at the age of 83 on November 2, 2016, in Manhattan, New York, of cancer.

== Early life ==
Cranshaw was born Dec. 10, 1932 in Evanston, Illinois. His parents were of Madagascan and Native American descent. His father, Stanley Irvine Cranshaw, was a jazz drummer from Kansas City who moved to Evanston and worked as an electrician. Bob's brother Stanley Jr. became a jazz pianist. Their adopted brother Emanuel became a vibraphonist.

== Career ==
In a 2016 interview with The New York Times, Rollins called Cranshaw "impeccable" and said that he "played with probably every musician in New York." In addition to five decades of collaboration with Rollins, Cranshaw contributed to Lee Morgan's The Sidewinder and Joe Henderson’s Inner Urge.

Cranshaw performed with Wes Montgomery, Coleman Hawkins, Johnny Hodges, Horace Silver, McCoy Tyner, Thelonious Monk, Jimmy Heath, James Moody, Buddy Rich, George Shearing, Joe Williams, Ella Fitzgerald, and Oscar Peterson. He also collaborated with musicians outside of jazz, including Paul Simon, Barry Manilow, Eddie Kendricks, Judy Collins, Rod Stewart, Stevie Wonder, Eric Clapton, Dolly Parton, Marvin Gaye, James Brown, and Debbie Gibson.

Cranshaw had an extensive career in television. He was a member of the first band for Saturday Night Live, and the bands backing the broadcasts of Dick Cavett and Merv Griffin. Cranshaw played for three decades with Joe Raposo composing music for Sesame Street.

He was an active supporter of the Jazz Foundation of America and the American Federation of Musicians.

== Discography ==
=== As sideman ===
With Pepper Adams

- Pepper Adams Plays the Compositions of Charlie Mingus (Workshop Jazz, 1964)

With Nat Adderley

- Little Big Horn! (Riverside, 1963)
- Sayin' Somethin' (Atlantic, 1966)

With Eric Alexander

- Second Impression (HighNote, 2016)

With Mose Allison

- Hello There, Universe (Atlantic, 1970)

With Gene Ammons

- Gene Ammons and Friends at Montreux (Prestige, 1973)

With Carole Bayer Sager

- Carole Bayer Sager (Elektra, 1977)

With Kenny Barron

- Sunset to Dawn (Muse, 1973)

With George Benson

- Goodies (Verve, 1968)
- Giblet Gravy (Verve, 1968)

With Walter Bishop Jr.

- Cubicle (Muse, 1978)

With Paul Bley

- BeBopBeBopBeBopBeBop (SteepleChase, 1990)

With Jonathan Butler

- Introducing Jonathan Butler (Jive, 1985)

With Jaki Byard

- Out Front! (Prestige, 1964)

With Donald Byrd

- Up with Donald Byrd (Verve, 1964)
- I'm Tryin' to Get Home (Blue Note, 1965)

With Betty Carter

- Inside Betty Carter (United Artists, 1965)

With Ray Charles

- A Message from the People (ABC, 1972)

With Johnny Coles

- Little Johnny C (Blue Note, 1963)

With Judy Collins

- Running for My Life (Elektra, 1980)

With Hank Crawford

- Wildflower (Kudu, 1973)

With Sonny Criss

- Up, Up and Away (Prestige, 1967)
- The Beat Goes On! (Prestige, 1968)
- Rockin' in Rhythm (Prestige, 1969)

With Frank Foster

- Manhattan Fever (Blue Note, 1968)

With George Freeman

- Man & Woman (Groove Merchant, 1974)

With Debbie Gibson

- Think with Your Heart (EMI, 1995)

With Dexter Gordon

- Gettin' Around (Blue Note, 1965)
- Blues à la Suisse (Prestige, 1973)
- Clubhouse (Rec. 1965; Blue Note, 1979)

With Bunky Green

- Visions (Vanguard, 1978)

With Grant Green

- Idle Moments (Blue Note, 1963)
- Matador (Blue Note, 1964)
- Solid (Blue Note, 1964)

With Friedrich Gulda

- Ineffable (Columbia, 1965)

With Slide Hampton

- Explosion! The Sound of Slide Hampton (Atlantic, 1962)

With Barry Harris

- Chasin' the Bird (Riverside, 1962)
- Luminescence! (Prestige, 1967)

With Eddie Harris

- Cool Sax from Hollywood to Broadway (Columbia, 1964)

With Hampton Hawes

- Playin' in the Yard (Prestige, 1973)

With Coleman Hawkins

- Sirius (Pablo, 1974)

With Jimmy Heath

- The Gap Sealer (Cobblestone, 1972)
- Love and Understanding (Muse, 1973)

With Joe Henderson

- Inner Urge (Blue Note, 1964)

With Maurice Hines

- To Nat "King" Cole with Love (Arbors, 2005)

With Johnny Hodges

- Joe's Blues (Verve, 1965) with Wild Bill Davis
- Blue Notes (Verve, 1966)

With Bobby Hutcherson

- Happenings (Blue Note, 1966)
- The Kicker (Rec. 1963; Blue Note, 1999)

With Milt Jackson

- Milt Jackson Quintet Live at the Village Gate (Riverside, 1963)
- In a New Setting (Limelight, 1964)
- Milt Jackson and the Hip String Quartet (Verve, 1968)

With Willis Jackson

- West Africa (Muse, 1973)
- Headed and Gutted (Muse, 1974)

With Antônio Carlos Jobim

- Terra Brasilis (RCA Victor, 1980)

With Howard Johnson and Gravity

- Gravity!!! (Verve, 1996)

With J. J. Johnson

- J.J.! (RCA Victor, 1964)

With Quincy Jones

- Golden Boy (Mercury, 1964)
- I/We Had a Ball (Limelight, 1965)

With Clifford Jordan

- Soul Fountain (Vortex, 1970)

With Eddie Kendricks

- Vintage '78 (Arista, 1978)

With Morgana King

- New Beginnings (Paramount Records, 1973)

With Eric Kloss

- We're Goin' Up (Prestige, 1967)
- Sky Shadows (Prestige, 1968)

With Irene Kral

- Better Than Anything (Äva, 1963)

With Yusef Lateef

- The Blue Yusef Lateef (Atlantic, 1968)

With Mike Longo

- Talk with the Spirits (Pablo, 1976)

With Johnny Lytle

- The Village Caller! (Riverside, 1963)
- The Loop (Tuba, 1965)
- People & Love (Milestone, 1972)

With Junior Mance

- Junior's Blues (Riverside, 1962)
- That Lovin' Feelin' (Milestone, 1972)

With Barry Manilow

- Barry Manilow II (Bell, 1974)

With Jack McDuff

- Magnetic Feel (Cadet, 1975)

With Jimmy McGriff

- Stump Juice (Groove Merchant, 1975)
- The Groover (JAM, 1982)

With Jackie McLean

- Right Now! (Blue Note, 1965)

With Carmen McRae

- Sings Lover Man and Other Billie Holiday Classics (Columbia Records, 1962)

With MJT + 3

- Walter Perkins' MJT + 3 (Vee-Jay, 1959)
- Make Everybody Happy (Vee-Jay, 1960)
- MJT + 3 (Vee-Jay, 1960)
- Message from Walton Street (Rec. 1960; Koch Jazz, 2000)

With Hank Mobley

- A Caddy for Daddy (Blue Note, 1966)
- Hi Voltage (Blue Note, 1967)
- Reach Out! (Blue Note, 1968)

With Grachan Moncur III

- Evolution (Blue Note, 1963)

With Wes Montgomery

- Movin' Wes (Verve, 1964)
- Bumpin' (Verve, 1965)

With James Moody

- Moody and the Brass Figures (Milestone, 1966)
- Don't Look Away Now! (Prestige, 1969)

With Lee Morgan

- Take Twelve (Jazzland, 1962)
- The Sidewinder (Blue Note, 1964)
- Delightfulee (Blue Note, 1966)
- The Gigolo (Blue Note, 1966)

With Oliver Nelson

- Oliver Nelson Plays Michelle (Impulse!, 1966)

With Duke Pearson

- Hush! (JazzLine, 1962)
- Wahoo! (Blue Note, 1965)
- Honeybuns (Atlantic, 1965)
- Prairie Dog (Atlantic, 1966)
- Introducing Duke Pearson's Big Band (Blue Note, 1967)
- The Phantom (Blue Note, 1968)
- Now Hear This (Blue Note, 1968)
- How Insensitive (Blue Note, 1969)
- It Could Only Happen with You (Blue Note, 1970)

With Houston Person

- Chocomotive (Prestige, 1967)
- Blue Odyssey (Prestige, 1968)

With Esther Phillips

- Esther Phillips Sings (Atlantic, 1966)

With Dave Pike

- Jazz for the Jet Set (Atlantic, 1966)

With Sonny Red

- Breezing (Jazzland, 1960)

With Leon Redbone

- From Branch to Branch (Atco, 1981)

With Irene Reid

- Room for One More (Verve, 1965)

With Max Roach

- Max Roach + 4 on the Chicago Scene (EmArcy, 1958)

With Sonny Rollins

- The Bridge (RCA, 1962)
- What's New? (RCA Victor, 1962)
- Our Man in Jazz (RCA Victor, 1962)
- Sonny Meets Hawk! (RCA Victor, 1963)
- Now's the Time! (RCA Victor, 1964)
- The Standard Sonny Rollins (RCA Victor, 1965)
- Next Album (Milestone, 1972)
- Horn Culture (Milestone, 1973)
- Sonny Rollins in Japan (Victor, 1973)
- The Cutting Edge (Milestone, 1974)
- Nucleus (Milestone, 1975)
- No Problem (Milestone, 1981)
- Reel Life (Milestone, 1982)
- G-Man (Milestone, 1986)
- Falling in Love with Jazz (Milestone, 1989)
- Here's to the People (Milestone, 1991)
- Old Flames (Milestone, 1993)
- Sonny Rollins + 3 (Milestone, 1995)
- Global Warming (Milestone, 1998)
- This Is What I Do (Milestone, 2000)
- Without a Song: The 9/11 Concert (Rec. 2001; Milestone, 2005)
- Sonny, Please (EmArcy, 2006)
- Road Shows, Vol. 1 (Doxy, 2008)
- Road Shows, Vol. 2 (Doxy, 2008)

With Charlie Rouse

- Moment's Notice (Storyville, 1978)

With Lalo Schifrin

- Once a Thief and Other Themes (Verve, 1965)

With Shirley Scott

- Great Scott!! (Impulse!, 1959)
- Blue Flames with Stanley Turrentine (Prestige, 1964)
- Queen of the Organ (Impulse!, 1964)
- Latin Shadows (Impulse!, 1965)
- Soul Song (Atlantic, 1968)

With Wayne Shorter

- Second Genesis (Vee-Jay, 1960)

With Horace Silver

- The Cape Verdean Blues (Blue Note, 1965)
- Serenade to a Soul Sister (Blue Note, 1968)
- In Pursuit of the 27th Man (Blue Note, 1972)
- Silver 'n Brass (Blue Note, 1975)

With Paul Simon

- There Goes Rhymin' Simon (Columbia, 1973)

With Frank Sinatra

- L.A. Is My Lady (Qwest, 1984)

With Jimmy Smith

- Hoochie Coochie Man (Verve, 1966)

With Rod Stewart

- Stardust: The Great American Songbook, Volume III (J Records, 2004)

With Billy Taylor

- Impromptu (Mercury, 1962)

With Clark Terry and Bob Brookmeyer

- Gingerbread Men (Mainstream, 1966)

With Bobby Timmons

- Do You Know the Way? (Milestone, 1968)

With Stanley Turrentine

- Hustlin' (Blue Note, 1964)
- Joyride (Blue Note, 1965)
- Rough 'n' Tumble (Blue Note, 1966)
- Easy Walker (Blue Note, 1966)
- The Spoiler (Blue Note, 1966)
- Always Something There (Blue Note, 1968)

With McCoy Tyner

- Live at Newport (Impulse!, 1963)

With Harold Vick

- Watch What Happens (RCA Victor, 1968)

With Loudon Wainwright III

- Loudon Wainwright III (Atlantic, 1970)

With Cedar Walton

- The Electric Boogaloo Song (Prestige, 1969)

With Cris Williamson

- Cris Williamson (Ampex Records, 1971)

With Joe Williams

- Me and the Blues (RCA Victor, 1964)
- That Holiday Feelin' (Verve, 1990)

With Mary Lou Williams

- Zoning (Mary, 1974)

With Victoria Williams

- Happy Come Home (Geffen, 1987)

With Larry Willis

- Just in Time (SteepleChase, 1989)

With Gerald Wilson

- New York, New Sound (Mack Avenue, 2003)

With Jack Wilson

- Easterly Winds (Blue Note, 1967)

With Reuben Wilson

- The Cisco Kid (Groove Merchant, 1973)

With Kai Winding

- The Incredible Kai Winding Trombones (Impulse!, 1960)
- Dirty Dog (Verve, 1966)

With The Young Lions

- The Young Lions (Vee-Jay, 1960)

With Joe Zawinul

- Money in the Pocket (Atlantic, 1967)
