= Kimati Dinizulu =

American drummer (born 1956)

- Also known as: Nana Kimati Dinizulu
- Born: Kimati Dinizulu; September 27, 1956; New York City
- Origin: New York City, New York
- Died: July 7, 2013 (aged 56)
- Genres: Folk, African, Jazz
- Occupations: percussionist, artist, musician
- Instruments: Drums
- Years active: 1984–2013
- Label: African Room Music
- Website: www.dinizulucenter.org

Nana Kimati Dinizulu (27 September 1956 – 7 July 2013) was an American virtuoso percussionist, who was widely acclaimed for his artistry with African percussion (including Apentemma, Apente, Sankofa, Kyene, djembe, and caxixi). He wrote works in the areas of jazz, folk, classical, popular, ballet, and musical theater.

== Life and career ==
Dinizulu was born September 27, 1956, in New York City. At an early age, he began playing drums and other percussion instruments. He drew inspiration from the musical heritage of his family. For many generations, the Dinizulu clan had been active in music and performance. Dinizulu's father, Nana Yao Opare Dinizulu (aka Gus Dinizulu, né Augustus Edwards; 1930–1991), an American, was an internationally acclaimed African drummer. Dinizulu's mother, Ohema Afua Owusua (née Alice Brown; 1930–2007), also an American, was a principal dancer for Asadata Dafora's Dance Company — the first dance company to put African dance and music on Broadway in the United States from the 1930s to the 1950s.

To gain a deeper knowledge of African traditions, as a young man Dinizulu traveled to Ghana where he lived and learned for two years before returning to the United States. Since then, he made over 30 trips to Africa, where he resided for part of the year. While in Ghana, he studied with expert drummers, Kofi Nabenadi, C. K. Ganyo, and Sully Emmorro. He also learned from elders of the Fanti people. A major influence on his musical growth was his involvement with the Fanti’s Asafo (warrior) music, a tradition dating back many centuries.

Apart from this, Dinizulu studied extensively with Haitian master drummers, Louis Celestine, Frisner Augustin, and Alphonse Cimber. He also studied various forms of traditional music from Brazil with the late Loramil Machado. Additionally, Dinizulu studied African and African-American hand drumming with his father, Baba Chief Bey (James Hawthorne Bey), Baba Kwame Ishangi, and many others. In addition, he has conducted extensive research with the Maroons of Jamaica, the Ewe of Togo, the Orisha worshipers of Trinidad and Tobago, Rada ritual musicians in Haiti and the Ring Shouters of the Georgia Sea Islands.

Dinizulu worked with several domestic and international cultural organizations, including UNESCO. UNESCO declared 2004 to be the International Year to Commemorate the Struggle against Slavery and its Abolition by the United Nations General Assembly. Dinizulu performed and lectured on endangered African-American instruments as a part of a UNESCO conference of scholars from around the world gathered at Tulane University.

Furthermore, Dinizulu worked with the Schomburg Center for Research in Black Culture, an organization for documenting, preserving, interpreting, and celebrating the culture and history of black people worldwide. He has performed music and conducted traditional African rituals for the Schomburg Center. He performed at the 75th-anniversary celebrations of the Schomburg Center which included pouring libation for the grand opening of the “Lest We Forget: The Triumph over Slavery Exhibit”.

Dinizulu also performed libation and drumming at “A Harlem Tribute to the Freedom Schooner Amistad”. He performed the drum rituals to help bring the Amistad into port in Harlem, New York.

Besides this, Dinizulu was a participant in the African-American delegation at the First Annual Emancipation Day Celebration in Ghana, Africa in 1998 which was sponsored by the government of Ghana. The African-American delegation was responsible for the re-interment of one escaped slave, Samuel Carson with a full state funeral. Emancipation Day is a remembrance of the abolition of Chattel Slavery.

Learning drumming and African culture, according to a biographical profile, was a lifetime process for Dinizulu. The profile asserted that he developed an encyclopedic knowledge of drums, percussion, and the art of drumming from his worldwide travels and studies of the music of other cultures as well as his heartfelt love for music and learning. Dinizulu had assembled a group of musicians from around the world, called the Kotoko Society, with whom he composed and performed regularly.

Nana Kimati Dinizulu died July 7, 2013.

== Music ==
=== Selected performances by Nana Kimati Dinizulu ===
Dinizulu made numerous worldwide performances over the past decades for many diverse groups of people. Some of Dinizulu's performances include Broadway’s Death and the King's Horseman which is a play written and directed by the legendary Wole Soyinka. Dinizulu has also undertaken many other Broadway productions. In addition, Dinizulu worked with prominent artists such as author Toni Morrison in her production N’Orleans - A Storyville Musical in which he scored music for the Congo Square scene and Satchmo’s last international concert in Ghana scene. He also performed as a percussionist with Odetta, Carmen de Lavallade, and Antonio Fargas in this production. Dinizulu co-composed with Monti Ellison Divining, (Judith Jamison's first ballet for the Alvin Ailey American Dance Theater), which was premiered by the company in 1984. He was also commissioned by choreographer Judith Jamison for the Alvin Ailey American Dance Theater to compose Riverside, which premiered in 1995 and became a smash hit. Divining and Riverside have been toured by Ailey extensively throughout the world.

In the year 2003, Dinizulu performed for the Blues Music Foundation at Radio City Music Hall in New York in the "Salute to the Blues" concert produced by Martin Scorsese and directed by Antoine Fuqua which was filmed for television broadcast. The Blues Music Foundation is a non-profit, international organization and is dedicated to the preservation of blues history and the celebration of blues excellence. Dinizulu performed with artists such as Mavis Staples, Buddy Guy, Mos Def, and Angelique Kidjo in this concert.

Apart from all this, Dinizulu also performed during Nelson Mandela’s 70th Birthday Tribute. He was also an active member of UNESCO’s efforts to promote knowledge about the slave trade in the world and has given several lectures such as on "African-American Endangered Musical Instruments" and performances on UNESCO’s behalf.

He also performed with the Paul Winter Consort which combined elements from various African, Asian, and South American cultures with jazz. Together they performed A Concert for the Earth (1985) which was recorded live at the United Nations General Assembly on World Environment Day. Dinizulu was also the percussionist with the Sonny Rollins band.

=== The Kotoko Society ===
Dinizulu established the Kotoko Society to promote traditional African music and awareness of African culture throughout the world and to continually explore musical styles from Africa, the Caribbean, Brazil, and all places where African music has found a new home. This society consists of musicians from countries such as Ghana, Senegal, Nigeria, Haiti, Trinidad, Barbados, Brazil, Puerto Rico, Jamaica, St. Martin, Panama, and the United States of America. The main emphasis of this society is to promote a new musical style called “Sankofa music” which was created by Dinizulu. Sankofa is a proverbial term from the language of the Akan people of Ghana.

The traditional instruments used to perform Sankofa have been gathered from a wide variety of lands and cultures and are represented in his Kotoko Society's performances. However, Dinizulu not only used these traditional instruments, but he also continually introduced new musical instruments of his design and construction, to complement those, which are already employed by the Kotoko Society. Playing over 500 traditional and modern instruments, the Kotoko Society regularly performs at leading concert venues as well as major universities and cultural institutions. They have performed at Lincoln Center, the American Museum of Natural History, Columbia University, Medgar Evers College, Long Island University, as well as other diverse environments such as the Trump Tower and the Philadelphia Folk Festival and toured in Japan and the Caribbean. In addition to these, the group regularly appeared at major nightclubs such as The Sounds of Brazil (S.O.B.’s).

== Collaborations ==
Dinizulu made studio recordings and performed live with artists, namely Toni Morrison, Alvin Ailey, Donald McKayle, Gregory Hines, Sonny Rollins, Nina Simone, Harry Belafonte, Wynton Marsalis, Jackie McLean, Dizzy Gillespie, Paul Winter, Lonnie Liston Smith, Steve Turre, Danilo Perez, Stefon Harris, Clifton Anderson, and Vanessa Rubin.

== Selected discography ==
=== As leader ===
1. "Auction Blocks & Slave Ships"
  (single)
  Featuring Yolanda Lee
  Maafa Remix
2. "Blackman Blues"
  (single)
  From The Pyramids To The Projects
  Instrumental Remix
  Featuring Olu Dara
3. "Africa Aye!"
  (single)
  Acapella Remix
  Featuring Yolanda Lee
4. "Africa Aye!"
  (single)
  Instrumental Remix
  Featuring Rene McLean & Lamont Savory
5. Ancestral Spirits (2010)
  1. "Africa Aye!"
  2. "The Coffle"
  3. "Auction Blocks & Slave Ships"
  4. "Plantation Blues"
  5. "The Journey"
  6. "African Heroes & Sheroes"
  7. "500 Years"
  8. "Sankofa"
6. Nassau Community College Folk Festival (1989, 1990)
  Kimati Dinizulu
  OCLC 760046934

=== As sideman and (or) arranger ===
1. Concert for the Earth (1984)
  Paul Winter
  OCLC 780007071
2. Silhouettes (1984)
  Lonnie Liston Smith
  OCLC 12249647
3. Wolf Eyes (1988)
  Paul Winter
  OCLC 22651146
4. Don't You Know I Care (1992)
  Antonio Hart
  OCLC 36194063, 644757157
5. Anthems (1992)
  Paul Winter
  OCLC 27315169
6. Undocumented Dancing (1992)
  Pat Kilbride
  OCLC 29172836
7. Pontius Pilate's Decision (1992)
  Delfeayo Marsalis
  OCLC 407066637
8. Sanctified Shells (1992)
  Steve Turre
  OCLC 689529723
9. The Journey (1993)
  Danilo Pérez
  OCLC 66768646
10. JLW (1994)
  Joe Louis Walker
  OCLC 689532450
11. Mental Images (1994)
  Robin Eubanks
  OCLC 63166860, 873660510
12. Jungle Swing (1995)
  Johnny Copeland
  OCLC 36436639, 873545569
13. Rhythm Within (1995)
  Steve Turre
  OCLC 885290044
14. 20th Anniversary Collection (1996)
  Green Linnet Records
  OCLC 152402641
15. Unforgivable Blackness:
  The Rise and Fall of Jack Johnson (1996; 2004)
  PBS Broadcast
  Wynton Marsalis
  OCLC 56899412
16. So Far (1997)
  Eileen Ivers Collection 1979-1995
  OCLC 872167868
17. New Horizons (1997)
  Vanessa Rubin
  OCLC 37622996
18. A Cloud of Red Dust (1997)
  Stefon Harris
  OCLC 40111079
19. Steve Turre (1997)
  Steve Turre
20. Reeltime (1996)
  Wynton Marsalis
  OCLC 871935557
21. Lotus Flower (1997)
  Steve Turre (1996)
  OCLC 689533619, 662229954
22. Wild Blue (1996)
  Eileen Ivers
  OCLC 34765863
23. 80th Anniversary: (1997)
  RCA Victor, Vol. 8
  OCLC 39073354
24. Celtic Music Today (1997)
  Various Artists
  OCLC 37894436, 872094600
25. Collected (1998)
  Danilo Pérez
  OCLC 45062730, 873051620
26. Joyful Noise:
  Celtic Favorites from Green Linnet (1998)
  OCLC 40586458
27. Green Linnet Records:
  25 Years of Celtic Music (2000)
  Various Artists
  OCLC 46735884
28. Without a Song: The 9/11 Concert (2001)
  Sonny Rollins
  Berklee Performance Center
  September 15, 2001
  OCLC 61411411, 593798314, 725319057
29. Love Like Fire (2001)
  Rick Henly
  OCLC 51500418
30. Road Shows, Vol. 3 (2001)
  Sonny Rollins
  OCLC 879345104
31. Lightning in a Bottle:
  A Salute to the Blues (2003)
  Series: Martin Scorsese Presents a Film
  Antoine Fuqua (director)
  OCLC 871954146
32. Slavery and the Making of America (2005)
  Original Soundtrack PBS Series
  OCLC 58471742
33. Sonny, Please (2006)
  Sonny Rollins
  OCLC 77552565
34. Decade (2007)
  Clifton Anderson
  OCLC 299611304
35. Sonny Rollins in Vienna (2008)
  Sonny Rollins
  OCLC 723926970

== Bibliography ==
=== References ===
- Ancestral Spirits. "Kamiti Dinizulu" → Record album liner notes by Salim Washington, Phd (né Michael Spence Washington; born 1958), Queens, New York: African Room Music LLC. 2010 – via Issuu.
- Billboard (December 15, 1984). "Audio Track: New York" → "The Aura Sonic Ltd". Vol. 96, no. 50. p. 41 – via Google Books.

- Guedj, Pauline (2014). "Through the Cleansing Medium of Sound – Black Arts, musique, danse et nationalisme culturel aux États-Unis" [Black Arts, Music, Dance, and Cultural Nationalism in the United States]. Cahiers d'Études Africaines. Musiques dans l’«Atlantique noir» [Music in the "Black Atlantic"] (in French). 54 (216): 1083–1113. ISSN 0008-0055; ISSN 1777-5353; JSTOR. 24476195.; OCLC 7290792830, 7781064454, 7481058019 & 7547383114, 5712411978, 5717552165, 909698906.
  Translation: In 1993, Nana Yao Opare Dinizulu died of a complex heart attack, his estate finally passed to his son, Nana Kimati Dinizulu. Until his death, on July 7, 2013, Kimati Dinizulu was the head of Bosum Dzemawodzi [Akan religion] in New York [based in Long Island City], of which he claimed to be the sofo (chief priest). A professional musician, Kimati combined his indoor activities in the house of worship with engagements in various productions. Kimati Dinizulu was born on September 27, 1956 (p. 1103).
- Natural History (January 1993). "At the American Museum of Natural History" → "Quincentennial Perspectives". Vol. 102, no. 1. American Museum of Natural History. p. 75 (col. 1) – via Internet Archive (Kahle/Austin Foundation).
- New York (October 5, 1987). "Entertainment Guide" → "Music and Dance" → "Concerts" → "Kimati Dimizulu". Vol. 20, no. 39. p. 138 – via Internet Archive.
- New York Times (The). "Yao Opare Dinizulu, Troupe Founder, 60". ProQuest 427989331 (US Newsstream database).
1. Blog..
2. Permalink. Vol. 140 (Late ed.). p. 14 (col. 6) – via TimesMachine.
- "Public Programs" "Nitelife: April 7–9, 1988" – via New Museum Archives.
  Kotoko Society is listed in the Program as performer.
