= Sonny Rollins on Impulse! =

1965 studio album by Sonny Rollins

Studio album by Sonny Rollins
- Released: August 1965
- Recorded: July 8, 1965
- Studio: Van Gelder Studio, Englewood Cliffs, NJ
- Genre: Jazz
- Length: 34:17
- Label: Impulse!
- Producer: Bob Thiele

Sonny Rollins chronology
There Will Never Be Another You (1965)	Sonny Rollins on Impulse! (1965)	Alfie (1966)

Sonny Rollins on Impulse! is a 1965 studio album by jazz saxophonist Sonny Rollins, his first to be released on the Impulse! label, featuring performances by Rollins with Ray Bryant, Walter Booker and Mickey Roker.

== Reception ==
Professional ratings
Review scores
Source	Rating
AllMusic	4/5 stars
The Rolling Stone Jazz Record Guide	4/5 stars
The Penguin Guide to Jazz Recordings	3.5/4 stars
DownBeat	4/5 stars

The AllMusic review by Thom Jurek states: "This date is significant for the manner in which Rollins attacks five standards with a quartet.... Sonny Rollins on Impulse! feels as if it were a recording Rollins had to get out of his system. But thank goodness for us because it's a winner through and through."

== Track listing ==
1. "On Green Dolphin Street" (Bronislaw Kaper, Ned Washington) – 7:10
2. "Everything Happens to Me" (Tom Adair, Matt Dennis) – 11:14
3. "Hold 'Em Joe" (Harry Thomas) – 5:30
4. "The Blue Room" (Lorenz Hart, Richard Rodgers) – 3:44
5. "Three Little Words" (Bert Kalmar, Harry Ruby) – 6:56

- Recorded at Van Gelder Studio, Englewood Cliffs, NJ, on July 8, 1965

== Personnel ==
- Sonny Rollins – tenor saxophone
- Ray Bryant – piano
- Walter Booker – bass
- Mickey Roker – drums
