= The Bridge (Sonny Rollins album) =

1962 studio album by Sonny Rollins

Studio album by Sonny Rollins
- Released: April 1962
- Recorded: January 30 and February 13–14, 1962
- Studios: RCA Victor, New York City
- Genre: Hard bop
- Length: 40:36
- Label: RCA Victor
- Producer: Bob Prince

Sonny Rollins chronology
Sonny Rollins and the Contemporary Leaders (1959)	The Bridge (1962)	What's New? (1962)

Professional ratings
Review scores
Source	Rating
DownBeat	5/5 stars
AllMusic	4.5/5 stars
The Rolling Stone Jazz Record Guide	4/5 stars
The Penguin Guide to Jazz Recordings	3.5/4 stars

The Bridge is a studio album by the jazz saxophonist Sonny Rollins, recorded in January and February 1962 and released that April. It was Rollins's first release following a three-year sabbatical and was his first album for RCA Victor. The saxophonist was joined by the musicians with whom he recorded for the next segment of his career: Jim Hall on guitar, Bob Cranshaw on bass, and Ben Riley on drums.

== History ==
In 1959, feeling pressured by the unexpected swiftness of his rise to fame, Rollins took a three-year hiatus to focus on perfecting his craft. A resident of the Lower East Side of Manhattan with no private space to practice, he took his saxophone up to the Williamsburg Bridge to practice alone: "I would be up there 15 or 16 hours at a time, spring, summer, fall and winter." His first recording after his return to performance took its name from those solo sessions. Critical reception to the album, which was not the revolutionary new jazz approach many expected, was mixed. Rollins, who had been considered groundbreaking in his thematic improvisations, was supplanted in critical buzz by the growing popularity of Ornette Coleman's free jazz.

== Reception ==
If not a tremendous departure from Rollins' earlier style, the album was nevertheless quite successful. Tagged by AllMusic as "a near-classic", the recording was declared by Inkblot Magazine to be "one of the greatest albums from one of jazz's greatest musicians". It is one of Rollins' most-lauded albums.

The album was inducted into the Grammy Hall of Fame in 2015.

== Re-releases ==
The album was re-released in 1976 in Japan and 1977 in the U.S. It was relaunched in 1992 on CD by Bluebird/RCA/BMG and remastered from the original master tapes for CD in 2003 for the Bluebird First Editions series. It has also been issued many times in other formats, for example as an audiophile LP with 45 rpm (Classic Records, 2000). It is also part of The Complete RCA Victor Recordings (1997).

== Track listing ==
1. "Without a Song" (Edward Eliscu, Billy Rose, Vincent Youmans) – 7:26
2. "Where Are You?" (Harold Adamson, Jimmy McHugh) – 5:10
3. "John S." (Sonny Rollins) – 7:46
4. "The Bridge" (Rollins) – 5:59
5. "God Bless the Child" (Arthur Herzog Jr., Billie Holiday) – 7:27
6. "You Do Something to Me" (Cole Porter) – 6:51

== Personnel ==
=== Musicians ===
- Sonny Rollins – tenor saxophone
- Jim Hall – electric guitar
- Bob Cranshaw – double bass
- Ben Riley – drums (all but 5)
- Harry "H.T." Saunders – drums (5)

"God Bless the Child" recorded on January 30, 1962
"Where Are You?", "John S." and "You Do Something to Me" recorded on February 13, 1962
"Without a Song" and "The Bridge" on February 14, 1962

=== Production ===
- Bob Prince – original session producer
- Ray Hall – engineer
- Chuck Stewart – cover photography
- George Avakian – liner notes

==== 1992 reissue ====
- John Snyder – digital producer
- Steve Backer – executive producer
- Joe Lopes – engineer
- Jay Newland – engineer
- Ira Gitler – liner notes
