= Next Album =

Studio album by Sonny Rollins
- Released: November 1972
- Recorded: July 14, 27, 1972
- Studio: Mercury Sound Studios, New York City
- Genre: Jazz
- Length: 43:04
- Label: Milestone
- Producer: Orrin Keepnews

Sonny Rollins chronology
East Broadway Run Down (1966)	Next Album (1972)	Horn Culture (1973)

Professional ratings
Review scores
Source	Rating
AllMusic	4.5/5 stars
DownBeat	5/5 stars
The Rolling Stone Jazz Record Guide	4/5 stars
The Penguin Guide to Jazz Recordings	3/4 stars

Next Album is a 1972 studio album by jazz saxophonist Sonny Rollins, his first to be released on the Milestone label. It features performances by Rollins with George Cables, Jack DeJohnette, Bob Cranshaw, and Arthur Jenkins. The cover photography was credited to Chuck Stewart.

== Reception ==
The AllMusic review by Scott Yanow states: "Sonny Rollins first album after ending his six-year retirement is a particularly strong effort. The highpoint is a ten-minute version of 'Skylark' that has a long unaccompanied section by the great tenor."

== Track listing ==
All compositions by Sonny Rollins, except where noted.

1. "Playin' in the Yard" – 10:25
2. "Poinciana" (Buddy Bernier, Nat Simon) – 9:58
3. "The Everywhere Calypso" – 7:54
4. "Keep Hold of Yourself" – 4:30
5. "Skylark" (Hoagy Carmichael, Johnny Mercer) – 10:17

== Personnel ==
- Sonny Rollins – tenor saxophone, soprano saxophone (track 2)
- George Cables – electric piano (tracks 1 and 2), piano
- Bob Cranshaw – bass, electric bass (track 1)
- David Lee – drums
- Jack DeJohnette – drums (tracks 1 and 4)
- Arthur Jenkins – congas, percussion (tracks 1 and 3)
- Recorded at Mercury Sound Studios, NYC, July 14 (tracks 1 and 3) and 27 (tracks 2 and 4–5), 1972.
