= Our Man in Jazz =

1962 live album by Sonny Rollins

Live album by Sonny Rollins
- Released: December 1962
- Recorded: July 27–30, 1962; February 20, 1963 (bonus tracks)
- Venue: The Village Gate, New York City
- Genre: Jazz
- Label: RCA Victor
- Producer: George Avakian, Bob Prince

Sonny Rollins chronology
What's New? (1962)	Our Man in Jazz (1962)	Sonny Meets Hawk! (1963)

Professional ratings
Review scores
Source	Rating
DownBeat (Original Lp release)	3/5 stars
The Penguin Guide to Jazz Recordings	3/4 stars
New Record Mirror	4/5 stars

Our Man in Jazz is a live album by jazz saxophonist Sonny Rollins, released by RCA Victor featuring July 1962 performances by Rollins with Don Cherry, Bob Cranshaw, and Billy Higgins. These performances have been described as contrasting from Rollins' previous style by moving to "very long free-form fancies, swaggering and impetuous".

The CD reissue supplements the original LP's three tracks with three tracks recorded in February of the following year, with Henry Grimes replacing Cranshaw on bass. These recordings originally appeared on 3 in Jazz (an LP also featuring performances by Gary Burton and Clark Terry).

== Track listing ==
All compositions by Sonny Rollins, except where noted.

1. "Oleo" – 25:26
2. "Dearly Beloved" (Jerome Kern, Johnny Mercer) – 8:17
3. "Doxy" – 15:17
4. "You Are My Lucky Star" (Nacio Herb Brown, Arthur Freed) – 3:46 Bonus track on CD rerelease
5. "I Could Write a Book" (Lorenz Hart, Richard Rodgers) – 3:16 Bonus track on CD rerelease
6. "There Will Never Be Another You" (Mack Gordon, Harry Warren) – 5:43 Bonus track on CD rerelease

- Recorded at The Village Gate in New York City on July 27–30, 1962 (tracks 1–3) and February 20, 1963 (tracks 4–6)

== Personnel ==
- Sonny Rollins – tenor saxophone
- Don Cherry – cornet
- Bob Cranshaw – bass
- Henry Grimes – bass (tracks 4–6)
- Billy Higgins – drums
