= Way Out West (Sonny Rollins album) =

1957 studio album by Sonny Rollins

Studio album by Sonny Rollins
- Released: 1957
- Recorded: March 7, 1957
- Studio: Contemporary Records (Los Angeles)
- Genre: Hard bop
- Length: 43:25
- Label: Contemporary
- Producer: Lester Koenig

Sonny Rollins chronology
Sonny Rollins, Vol. 1 (1957)	Way Out West (1957)	Sonny Rollins, Vol. 2 (1957)

Way Out West is a 1957 album by American saxophonist Sonny Rollins, with bassist Ray Brown and drummer Shelly Manne, neither of whom had previously played or recorded with Rollins. This was the first time Rollins recorded an album with only bass and drums, with no pianist or guitarist playing chords. The album is widely regarded as a high point in Rollins' discography.

The title has several meanings: Rollins was a native of New York on the eastern coast of the United States, while the album was recorded in the western part of the country in Los Angeles and with musicians associated with West Coast Jazz style. Additionally, Rollins recorded several songs best associated with country and western music, as his cowboy hat and gunslinger costume for the album's cover art implies. The cover photo was taken by celebrated jazz photographer William Claxton. Rollins stands amid a stretch of desert vegetation, dressed in a Stetson hat, gun belt, and empty holster, and holds his saxophone at waist level as if it were a pistol. The photo concept was Rollins' own idea to celebrate his first trip West.

According to the liner notes by producer Lester Koenig, recording began at 3:00 a.m. to fit the musicians' busy schedules, but "[a]t 7 a.m., after four hours of intense concentration, during which they recorded half the album, and should have been exhausted, Sonny said, 'I'm hot now.' Shelly who had been up for 24 hours, said, 'Man, I feel like playing.' And Ray, who was equally tired and had a studio call for the afternoon, just smiled."

The reissue of the album on CD has additional takes of three of the songs, including the title track. These additional takes are all about twice as long as those released on the original album, containing much longer solos from all three members of the band.

== Reception ==
Contemporary professional ratings
Review scores
Source	Rating
DownBeat	5/5 stars

Retrospective professional ratings
Review scores
Source	Rating
AllMusic	5/5 stars
Tom Hull	A
The Penguin Guide to Jazz Recordings	3.5/4 stars
Pitchfork	8.8/10
The Rolling Stone Jazz Record Guide	5/5 stars

In his AllMusic review, Scott Yanow wrote: "The timeless Way out West established Sonny Rollins as jazz's top tenor saxophonist (at least until John Coltrane surpassed him the following year). Joined by bassist Ray Brown and drummer Shelly Manne, Rollins is heard at one of his peaks."

== Track listing ==
1. "I'm an Old Cowhand (From the Rio Grande)" (Johnny Mercer) – 5:42
2. "Solitude" (Duke Ellington) – 7:52
3. "Come, Gone" (Sonny Rollins) – 7:53
4. "Wagon Wheels" (Peter DeRose) – 10:11
5. "There Is No Greater Love" (Isham Jones) – 5:17
6. "Way Out West" (Rollins) – 6:30

=== CD reissue ===
When the album was reissued on CD in 1988 (and in subsequent years), some alternate takes were included.

1. "I'm an Old Cowhand" (Mercer) – 5:40
2. "I'm an Old Cowhand" [Alternate Take] – 10:06
3. "Solitude" (Ellington) – 7:49
4. "Come, Gone" (Rollins) – 7:50
5. "Come, Gone" [Alternate Take] – 10:27
6. "Wagon Wheels" (DeRose) – 10:09
7. "There Is No Greater Love" (Jones) – 5:14
8. "Way Out West" (Rollins) – 6:28
9. "Way Out West" [Alternate Take] – 6:36

The 20-bit CD issue groups the alternate takes at the end.

== Personnel ==
- Sonny Rollins - tenor saxophone
- Ray Brown - bass
- Shelly Manne - drums
