= The Standard Sonny Rollins =

1965 studio album by Sonny Rollins

Studio album by Sonny Rollins
- Released: August 1965
- Recorded: June 11, 23, 24, 26, July 2 and 9, 1964
- Genre: Jazz
- Length: 34:17
- Label: RCA Victor
- Producer: George Avakian

Sonny Rollins chronology
Now's the Time (1964)	The Standard Sonny Rollins (1965)	There Will Never Be Another You (1965)

Professional ratings
Review scores
Source	Rating
AllMusic	4/5 stars
The Penguin Guide to Jazz Recordings	3/4 stars
Record Mirror	4/5 stars

The Standard Sonny Rollins is an album by jazz saxophonist Sonny Rollins, his last release for RCA Victor, featuring performances by Rollins with Herbie Hancock, Jim Hall, David Izenzon, Teddy Smith, Stu Martin, Bob Cranshaw and Mickey Roker.

== Track listing ==
1. "Autumn Nocturne" (Kim Gannon, Josef Myrow) – 2:59
2. "Night and Day (Cole Porter) – 3:17
3. "Love Letters" (Edward Heyman, Victor Young) – 3:27
4. "My One and Only Love" (Robert Mellin, Guy Wood) – 5:59
5. "Three Little Words" (Bert Kalmar, Harry Ruby) – 2:14
6. "Trav'lin' Light" (Johnny Mercer, Jimmy Mundy, Trummy Young) – 4:06
7. "I'll Be Seeing You" (Sammy Fain, Irving Kahal) – 1:36
8. "My Ship" (Ira Gershwin, Kurt Weill) – 4:11
9. "It Could Happen to You" (Johnny Burke, Jimmy Van Heusen) – 4:19
10. "Long Ago (and Far Away)" (Gershwin, Jerome Kern) – 2:47
11. "Winter Wonderland" (Felix Bernard, Dick Smith) – 5:18 Bonus track on CD rerelease
12. "When You Wish upon a Star" (Leigh Harline, Ned Washington) – 3:16 Bonus track on CD rerelease
13. "Trav'lin' Light" [alternate take] (Mercer, Mundy, Young) – 12:44 Bonus track on CD rerelease

== Personnel ==
- Sonny Rollins – tenor saxophone
- Herbie Hancock – piano (tracks 4, 6, 9 and 11–13)
- Jim Hall – guitar (tracks 3, 6, 8, 10 and 13)
- David Izenzon – bass (tracks 6 and 13)
- Teddy Smith – bass (tracks 6 and 13)
- Bob Cranshaw – bass (tracks 1–5 and 7–12)
- Stu Martin – drums (tracks 6 and 13)
- Mickey Roker – drums (tracks 1–5 and 7–12)
- Recorded in New York City on June 11 (tracks 6 and 13), 23 (track 7), 24 (tracks 2, 5 and 8), 26 (tracks 3 and 10), July 2 (tracks 4, 9 and 11–12) and 6 (track 1), 1964
