= Sonny Rollins, Volume 1 =

1957 studio album by Sonny Rollins

Sonny Rollins

Studio album by Sonny Rollins
- Released: March 1957
- Recorded: December 16, 1956
- Studios: Van Gelder Studio, Hackensack, New Jersey
- Genre: Hard bop
- Length: 41:00
- Label: Blue Note
- Producer: Alfred Lion

Sonny Rollins chronology
Sonny Boy (1956)	Sonny Rollins (1957)	Way Out West (1957)

Professional ratings
Review scores
Source	Rating
AllMusic	4/5 stars
DownBeat	4/5 stars
The Penguin Guide to Jazz Recordings	3/4 stars
The Rolling Stone Jazz Record Guide	4/5 stars

Sonny Rollins, also known as Sonny Rollins, Volume 1, is an album by American jazz saxophonist Sonny Rollins recorded on December 16, 1956, and released on Blue Note the following year.

== Track listing ==
All compositions by Sonny Rollins, except where noted.

=== Side one ===
1. "Decision" – 8:03
2. "Bluesnote" – 7:01
3. "How Are Things in Glocca Morra?" (Burton Lane, E.Y. "Yip" Harburg) – 6:20

=== Side two ===
1. "Plain Jane" – 10:00
2. "Sonnysphere" – 9:36

== Personnel ==
- Sonny Rollins – tenor saxophone
- Donald Byrd – trumpet
- Wynton Kelly – piano
- Gene Ramey – bass
- Max Roach – drums

Technical personnel

- Alfred Lion – producer
- Rudy Van Gelder – recording engineer, mastering
- Reid Miles – design
- Francis Wolff – photography
- Leonard Feather – liner notes

== Charts ==
Chart performance for Sonny Rollins, Volume 1
Chart (2025)	Peak position
Greek Albums (IFPI)	55
