= Sonny Meets Hawk! =

1963 studio album by Sonny Rollins and Coleman Hawkins

Studio album by Sonny Rollins and Coleman Hawkins
- Released: October 1963
- Recorded: July 15, 1963; July 18, 1963
- Studios: RCA Victor Studio B, New York City
- Genre: Jazz
- Length: 41:21
- Label: RCA Victor
- Producer: George Avakian

Sonny Rollins chronology
Our Man in Jazz (1962)	Sonny Meets Hawk! (1963)	Now's the Time (1964)

Coleman Hawkins chronology
Back in Bean's Bag (1962)	Sonny Meets Hawk! (1963)	Wrapped Tight (1965)

Professional ratings
Review scores
Source	Rating
Down Beat	
AllMusic	4/5 stars
The Penguin Guide to Jazz Recordings	3/4 stars

Sonny Meets Hawk! is a 1963 album by jazz saxophonist Sonny Rollins, with Coleman Hawkins appearing as guest artist. It was recorded at RCA Victor Studio B in New York City on July 15 and 18, 1963. The album features some of Rollins's most avant-garde playing.

The album marks the first time the two saxophonists had entered a recording studio together, although they had appeared on stage together briefly that same year at the Newport Jazz Festival.

== Track listing ==
=== Side one ===
1. "Yesterdays" (Jerome Kern, Otto Harbach) – 5:13
2. "All the Things You Are" (Kern, Oscar Hammerstein II) – 9:33
3. "Summertime" (DuBose Heyward, George Gershwin, Ira Gershwin) – 5:58

=== Side two ===
1. "Just Friends" (John Klenner, Sam M. Lewis) – 4:40
2. "Lover Man (Oh Where Can You Be?)" (Jimmy Davis, Roger "Ram" Ramirez, James Sherman) – 8:54
3. "At McKies'" (Sonny Rollins) – 7:03

== Personnel ==
- Sonny Rollins – tenor saxophone
- Coleman Hawkins – tenor saxophone
- Paul Bley – piano
- Bob Cranshaw – bass (tracks 1, 2, 5)
- Henry Grimes – bass (tracks 3, 4, 6)
- Roy McCurdy – drums
