= Without a Song: The 9/11 Concert =

2005 live album by Sonny Rollins

Live album by Sonny Rollins
- Released: August 30, 2005
- Recorded: September 15, 2001
- Genre: Jazz
- Label: Milestone
- Producer: Sonny Rollins, Lucille Rollins

Sonny Rollins chronology
Live in London (2004)	Without a Song: The 9/11 Concert (2005)	Live in Europe (2006)

Without a Song: The 9/11 Concert is a 2005 live album by jazz saxophonist Sonny Rollins, recorded in Boston on September 15, 2001.

== Background ==
On September 11, 2001, the 71-year-old Rollins heard the World Trade Center collapse from his Greenwich Street apartment only a few blocks away, and was forced to evacuate with only his saxophone in hand. Although he was shaken by the incident, he traveled to Boston four days later to fulfil an engagement playing a concert at the Berklee Performance Center of Berklee College of Music. The live recording of that performance was released on CD in 2005 as Without a Song: The 9/11 Concert.

== Reception ==
Professional ratings
Review scores
Source	Rating
AllMusic	4.5/5 stars
The Penguin Guide to Jazz Recordings	3/4 stars

Writing for AllMusic, Scott Yanow praised the album, saying that it was "arguably Sonny Rollins' best recording of the past decade, and is a highly recommended set", and that "[w]hile many of his detractors feel that his studio recordings since the 1970s have not had the excitement of his live concerts, they should find much to enjoy on this passionate if not flawless set". The review concluded that "[h]is playing sounds a bit like a purging of bad memories, while at the same time seeming hopeful about the future."

Rollins's performance of "Why Was I Born?" won the 2006 Grammy Award for Jazz Instrumental Solo.

== Track listing ==
1. "Without a Song" (music: Vincent Youmans; lyrics: Billy Rose, Edward Eliscu) – 16:37
2. "Global Warming" (Sonny Rollins) – 15:16
3. "Introductions" – 0:59
4. "A Nightingale Sang in Berkeley Square" (music: Manning Sherwin; lyrics: Eric Maschwitz) – 10:57
5. "Why Was I Born?" (music: Jerome Kern; lyrics: Oscar Hammerstein II) – 16:14
6. "Where or When" (Rodgers and Hart) – 12:20

== Personnel ==
- Sonny Rollins – tenor saxophone
- Clifton Anderson – trombone
- Stephen Scott – piano
- Bob Cranshaw – electric bass
- Perry Wilson – drums
- Kimati Dinizulu – percussion
