= Sonny Rollins =

American jazz saxophonist and composer (1930–2026)

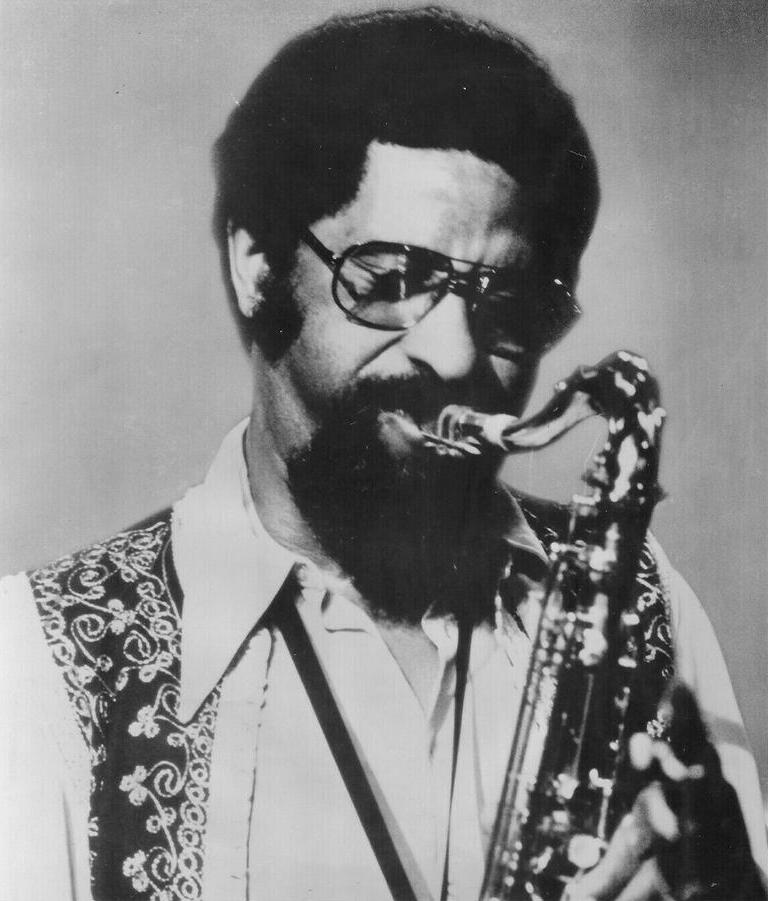
- Rollins in 1974

Background information
- Born: Walter Theodore Rollins; September 7, 1930; Harlem, New York City, U.S.
- Died: May 25, 2026 (aged 95) Woodstock, New York, U.S.
- Genres: Jazz; hard bop
- Occupations: Musician; composer; bandleader
- Instruments: Alto saxophone; tenor saxophone; soprano saxophone
- Works: Discography
- Years active: 1947–2014
- Labels: Prestige; Blue Note; Contemporary; RCA Victor; Impulse!; Milestone; Doxy; Okeh; EmArcy
- Spouses: Dawn Finney (m. 1957; div. 1957) Lucille Pearson (m. 1965; died 2004)
- Website: sonnyrollins.com

Walter Theodore "Sonny" Rollins (September 7, 1930 – May 25, 2026) was an American jazz tenor saxophonist who is widely recognized as one of the most important and influential jazz musicians in history.

In a seven-decade career, Rollins recorded more than 60 albums as a leader. His 1956 album Saxophone Colossus was selected for preservation by the National Recording Registry of the Library of Congress in 2016. A number of his compositions, including "St. Thomas", "Oleo", "Doxy", and "Airegin", have become jazz standards.

Rollins was often called "the greatest living improviser". Sometimes known as "saxophone colossus", he was awarded a lifetime Grammy Award and was honored with the Kennedy Center Honors in 2011. He was credited as a defining figure of the jazz genre.

== Early life ==
Walter Theodore Rollins was born on September 7, 1930, at a tenement house on 137th Street between Lenox Avenue and Seventh Avenue, in Harlem, New York City, to parents – Walter, a naval steward, and Valborg (née Solomon) – who were from what was then the Danish Virgin Islands: his father was born in Saint Croix, his mother in Saint Thomas. The youngest of three siblings, Rollins grew up in central Harlem and its Sugar Hill district in a musical family: his father played the clarinet, his sister played piano, and his older brother played violin. As an infant, Rollins was nicknamed Sonny by his activist grandmother Miriam Solomon, who looked after him while his mother worked. Describing the Harlem of his childhood, Rollins said: "It was an extraordinary environment. We were surrounded by giants of the black community. You know the writer WEB Du Bois? He lived on our block. ...There were other key people in the civil rights movement. Paul Robeson, Duke Ellington, Coleman Hawkins, Don Redman. All pillars of the black community." One of Rollins's mentors was jazz pianist Thelonious Monk.

Rollins attended Edward W. Stitt Junior High School and graduated from Benjamin Franklin High School in East Harlem. Rollins began taking piano lessons at the age of nine but switched to alto saxophone at the age of 11 after being inspired by Louis Jordan. In 1946, influenced by his idol Coleman Hawkins, he switched to tenor saxophone, which ultimately became his signature instrument.

Largely self-taught, Rollins played in a neighborhood band during his high school years alongside other future jazz legends, including Jackie McLean, Kenny Drew, and Art Taylor.

== Career ==
=== 1949–1956 ===
After graduating from high school in 1948, Rollins began performing professionally; he made his first recordings in early 1949 as a sideman with the bebop singer Babs Gonzales (a group of which trombonist J. J. Johnson was the arranger). Within the next few months, Rollins began to make a name for himself, recording with Johnson and appearing under the leadership of pianist Bud Powell – alongside trumpeter Fats Navarro and drummer Roy Haynes – on a seminal hard bop session, the basis for recordings of Powell's compositions "Bouncing with Bud" and "Dance of the Infidels".

In early 1950, Rollins was arrested for armed robbery and spent ten months in Rikers Island jail before being released on parole; in 1952, he was re-arrested for violating the terms of his parole by using heroin. Between 1951 and 1953, he recorded with Miles Davis, the Modern Jazz Quartet, Charlie Parker, and Thelonious Monk. A breakthrough arrived in 1954, when Rollins recorded his famous compositions "Oleo", "Airegin", and "Doxy" with a quintet led by Davis that also featured pianist Horace Silver, bassist Percy Heath, and drummer Kenny Clarke. These recordings appear on the album Miles Davis with Sonny Rollins. In Sonny Rollins: The Definitive Musical Guide, Peter Niklas Wilson notes of the recording, "This probably represents a singular achievement for a musician officially hired as a sideman: he [Rollins] brings three compositions to a colleague's recording session, all three are recorded, and all three immediately become jazz standards."

In 1955, Rollins entered the Federal Medical Center, Lexington. While there, he volunteered for then-experimental methadone therapy and was able to break his heroin habit, after which he lived for a time in Chicago, briefly rooming with the trumpeter Booker Little. Rollins initially feared sobriety would impair his musicianship, but then went on to greater success.

Rollins briefly joined the Miles Davis Quintet in the summer of 1955. Later that year, he joined the Clifford Brown–Max Roach quintet. The studio albums Clifford Brown and Max Roach at Basin Street and Sonny Rollins Plus 4 document his time in that band. After the deaths of Brown and band pianist Richie Powell in a June 1956 automobile accident, Rollins continued playing with Roach and began releasing albums under his own name on Prestige Records, Blue Note, Riverside, and the Los Angeles label Contemporary.

His widely acclaimed album Saxophone Colossus was recorded on June 22, 1956, at Rudy Van Gelder's studio in New Jersey, with Tommy Flanagan on piano, former Jazz Messengers bassist Doug Watkins, and his favorite drummer, Roach. This was Rollins's sixth recording as a leader and it included his best-known composition "St. Thomas" – a Caribbean calypso based on "Sponger Money", a tune sung to him by his mother in his childhood – as well as the fast bebop number "Strode Rode", and "Moritat" (the Kurt Weill composition also known as "Mack the Knife"). A long blues solo on Saxophone Colossus, "Blue 7", was analyzed in depth by the composer and critic Gunther Schuller in a 1958 article in The Jazz Review.

Sonny Rollins "St. Thomas" (1956)
Rollins's improvisation on "St. Thomas" starts immediately after the melody.

In the solo for "St. Thomas", Rollins used repetition of a rhythmic pattern, and variations of that pattern, covering only a few tones in a tight range, and employing staccato and semi-detached notes. This was interrupted by a sudden flourish, utilizing a much wider range before returning to the former pattern. (Listen to the music sample.) In his book The Jazz Style of Sonny Rollins, David N. Baker explains that Rollins "very often uses rhythm for its own sake. He will sometimes improvise on a rhythmic pattern instead of on the melody or changes."

From his recording of "St. Thomas" onwards, Rollins's use of calypso rhythms was one of his signature contributions to jazz; he often performed traditional Caribbean tunes such as "Hold 'Em Joe" and "Don't Stop the Carnival" and wrote many original calypso-influenced compositions, among them "Duke of Iron", "The Everywhere Calypso", and "Global Warming". The album Saxophone Colossus was selected for preservation by the National Recording Registry of the Library of Congress in 2016.

In 1956, Rollins recorded Tenor Madness, using Davis's group – pianist Red Garland, bassist Paul Chambers, and drummer Philly Joe Jones. The title track is the only recording of Rollins with John Coltrane, who was also a member of Davis's group.

At the end of the year, Rollins appeared as a sideman on Thelonious Monk's album Brilliant Corners and also recorded his own first album for Blue Note Records, entitled Sonny Rollins, Volume 1, with Donald Byrd on trumpet, Wynton Kelly on piano, Gene Ramey on bass, and Roach on drums.

=== 1957 – spring 1959 ===
In 1957, Rollins married his first wife, actress and model Dawn Finney. He separated from Finney later that same year and proposed to another woman, Shirley Carter, before he moved in with Lucille Pearson two years later.

That year, Rollins pioneered the use of bass and drums, without piano, as accompaniment for his saxophone solos, a texture that came to be known as "strolling". Two early tenor/bass/drums trio recordings are Way Out West and A Night at the "Village Vanguard", both recorded in 1957. Way Out West, showing Rollins dressed as a cowboy in the desert, was so named because it was recorded for California-based Contemporary Records (with Los Angeles drummer Shelly Manne), and because it included Western songs such as the 1930s "Wagon Wheels" and "I'm an Old Cowhand". The Village Vanguard album consists of two sets: a matinee with bassist Donald Bailey and drummer Pete La Roca and an evening set with bassist Wilbur Ware and drummer Elvin Jones. Rollins used the trio format intermittently throughout his career, sometimes taking the unusual step of using his saxophone as a rhythm section instrument during bass and drum solos. Lew Tabackin cited Rollins's pianoless trio as an inspiration to lead his own. Joe Henderson, David S. Ware, Joe Lovano, Branford Marsalis, and Joshua Redman led pianoless saxophone trios.

While in Los Angeles in 1957, Rollins met alto saxophonist Ornette Coleman and they practiced together. Coleman, a pioneer of free jazz, stopped using a pianist in his own band two years later. By this time, Rollins had become well-known for improvising based on relatively banal or unconventional songs, among them "There's No Business Like Show Business" on Work Time (1956), "Toot, Toot, Tootsie" on The Sound of Sonny (1957), and later, "Sweet Leilani" on the Grammy-winning album This Is What I Do (2000).

Rollins acquired the nickname "Newk" because of his facial resemblance to Brooklyn Dodgers star pitcher Don Newcombe.

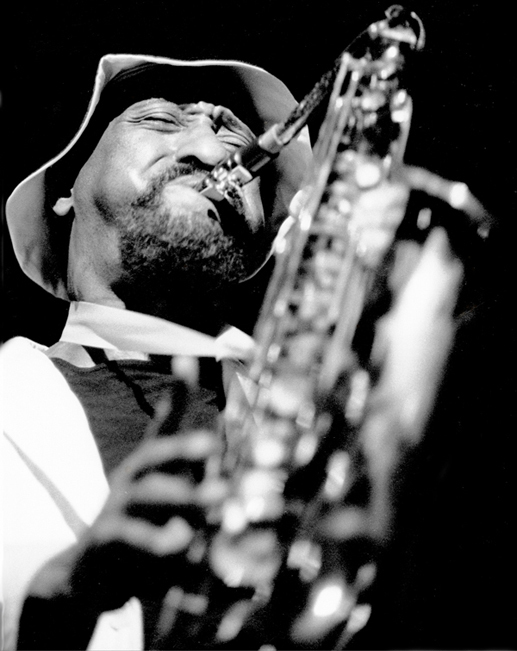
Rollins at the San Francisco Opera House on February 22, 1982

In 1957, Rollins made his Carnegie Hall debut and recorded again for Blue Note with J. J. Johnson on trombone, Horace Silver or Monk on piano, and drummer Art Blakey (released as Sonny Rollins, Vol. 2). That December, Rollins and fellow tenor saxophonist Sonny Stitt were featured together on Dizzy Gillespie's album Sonny Side Up. In 1958, Rollins appeared in Art Kane's A Great Day in Harlem photograph of jazz musicians in New York; he was the last surviving musician from the photo.

The same year, Rollins recorded another landmark piece for saxophone, bass, and drums trio: Freedom Suite. His original sleeve notes declared, "How ironic that the Negro, who more than any other people can claim America's culture as his own, is being persecuted and repressed; that the Negro, who has exemplified the humanities in his very existence, is being rewarded with inhumanity." The title track is a 19-minute improvised bluesy suite; the other side of the album features hard bop workouts of popular show tunes. Oscar Pettiford and Max Roach provided bass and drums, respectively. The LP was available only briefly in its original form, before the record company repackaged it as part of Shadow Waltz, the title of another piece on the record.

Following Sonny Rollins and the Big Brass (Sonny Rollins Brass/Sonny Rollins Trio), Rollins made one more studio album in 1958, Sonny Rollins and the Contemporary Leaders, before taking a three-year break from recording. This was a session for Contemporary Records and saw Rollins recording an esoteric mixture of tunes, including "Rock-a-Bye Your Baby with a Dixie Melody" with a West Coast group made up of pianist Hampton Hawes, guitarist Barney Kessel, bassist Leroy Vinnegar, and drummer Shelly Manne.

In 1959, Rollins toured Europe for the first time, performing in Sweden, the Netherlands, Germany, Italy, and France.

=== Summer 1959 – fall 1961: The bridge ===
By 1959, Rollins had become frustrated with what he perceived as his own musical limitations and took the first – and most famous – of his musical sabbaticals. While living on the Lower East Side of Manhattan, he ventured to the pedestrian walkway of the Williamsburg Bridge to practice, in order to avoid disturbing a neighboring expectant mother. Today, a 15-story apartment building named "The Rollins" stands on the Grand Street site where he lived. Almost every day from the summer of 1959 through the end of 1961, Rollins practiced on the bridge, next to the subway tracks. Rollins admitted that he would often practice for 15 or 16 hours a day, no matter what season. In the summer of 1961, the journalist Ralph Berton happened to pass by the saxophonist on the bridge one day and published an article in Metronome magazine about the occurrence. During this period, Rollins became a dedicated practitioner of yoga.

Rollins ended his sabbatical in November 1961. He later said, "I could have probably spent the rest of my life just going up on the bridge. I realized, no, I have to get back into the real world." In 2016, a campaign was initiated that sought to have the bridge renamed in Rollins's honor.

=== Winter 1961 – 1969: Musical explorations ===
In November 1961, Rollins returned to the jazz scene with a residency at the Jazz Gallery in Greenwich Village; in March 1962, he appeared on Ralph Gleason's television series Jazz Casual. During the 1960s, Rollins lived at 195 Willoughby Walk in Brooklyn, New York.

He named his 1962 "comeback" album The Bridge at the start of a contract with RCA Victor. Produced by George Avakian, the disc was recorded with a quartet featuring guitarist Jim Hall, Ben Riley on drums, and bassist Bob Cranshaw. This became one of Rollins's best-selling records; in 2015, it was inducted into the Grammy Hall of Fame.

Rollins's contract with RCA Victor lasted through 1964. Each album he recorded differed radically from the previous one. The 1962 disc What's New? explored Latin rhythms. On the album Our Man in Jazz, recorded live at the Village Gate, he explored avant-garde playing with a quartet that featured Cranshaw on bass, Billy Higgins on drums, and Don Cherry on cornet. Rollins also played with a tenor saxophone hero, Coleman Hawkins, and free jazz pianist Paul Bley on Sonny Meets Hawk! (1963), and he re-examined jazz standards and Great American Songbook melodies in 1964 on Now's the Time and The Standard Sonny Rollins (which featured pianist Herbie Hancock).

In 1963, Rollins made the first of many tours of Japan.

In 1965, he married Lucille Pearson, born on July 25, 1928, in Kansas City, Missouri. She eventually became his manager and producer. They moved (partially, then completely) from New York City to Germantown, New York, where she died on November 27, 2004.

In 2007, recordings from a 1965 residency at Ronnie Scott's Jazz Club were released by the Harkit label as Live in London; they offer a very different picture of Rollins's playing from the studio albums of the period.

Upon signing with Impulse! Records, he recorded a soundtrack to the 1966 film Alfie, as well as the live album There Will Never Be Another You and Sonny Rollins on Impulse! (1965). After East Broadway Run Down (1966), which featured trumpeter Freddie Hubbard, bassist Jimmy Garrison, and drummer Elvin Jones, Rollins did not release another studio album for six years.

In 1968, he was the subject of a television documentary entitled Who is Sonny Rollins? (in the series Creative Persons), directed by Dick Fontaine.

Rollins performing in Helsinki in 1972

=== 1969–1971: Second sabbatical ===
In 1969, Rollins took another two-year sabbatical from public performance. During this period, he visited Jamaica for the first time and spent several months studying yoga, meditation, and Eastern philosophies at an ashram in Powai, India, a district of Mumbai.

=== 1971–2000: Career resurgence ===
He returned from his second sabbatical with a concert in Kongsberg, Norway, in 1971. Reviewing a March 1972 performance at New York's Village Vanguard night club, The New Yorker critic Whitney Balliett wrote that Rollins "had changed again. He had become a whirlwind. His runs roared, and there were jarring staccato passages and furious double-time spurts. He seemed to be shouting and gesticulating on his horn, as if he were waving his audience into battle." The same year, he released Next Album and moved to Germantown, New York. Also in 1972, he was awarded a Guggenheim Fellowship in composition.

During the 1970s and 1980s, he also became drawn to R&B, pop, and funk rhythms. Some of his bands during this period featured electric guitar, electric bass, and usually more pop- or funk-oriented drummers.

In 1974, Rollins added jazz bagpiper Rufus Harley to his band. The group was filmed performing live at Ronnie Scott's in London by the BBC, and in February 2012, a rescued and restored recording of the gig was broadcast by BBC Four as part of the Arena series. (Note: The program was rebroadcast, on May 29, 2026, in tribute to Rollins.) For most of this period, Rollins was recorded by producer Orrin Keepnews for Milestone Records (the compilation Silver City: A Celebration of 25 Years on Milestone contains a selection from these years). In 1978, Rollins toured together with McCoy Tyner, Ron Carter, and Al Foster as the Milestone Jazzstars. In June of that year, Rollins joined many other major jazz artists in a performance for President Jimmy Carter on the South Lawn of the White House.

It was also during this period that Rollins's passion for unaccompanied saxophone solos came to the fore. In 1979, he played unaccompanied on The Tonight Show, and in 1985, he released The Solo Album, recorded live at the Museum of Modern Art in New York. He also frequently played long, extemporaneous unaccompanied cadenzas during performances with his band; a prime example is his introduction to the tune "Autumn Nocturne" on the 1978 album Don't Stop the Carnival.

By the 1980s, Rollins had stopped playing small nightclubs and was appearing mainly in concert halls or outdoor arenas; through the late 1990s, he occasionally performed at large New York rock clubs such as Tramps and The Bottom Line. He added (uncredited) saxophone improvisations to three tracks by the Rolling Stones for their 1981 album Tattoo You, including the single "Waiting on a Friend" and the long jam "Slave". That November, he led a saxophone masterclass on French television. In 1983, he was honored with a Jazz Master Fellowship by the National Endowment for the Arts.

In 1986, documentary filmmaker Robert Mugge released a film titled Saxophone Colossus. It featured two Rollins performances: a quintet concert at Opus 40 in upstate New York and a performance with the Yomiuri Nippon Symphony Orchestra in Japan of his Concerto for Saxophone and Symphony, a work composed in collaboration with the Finnish pianist and composer Heikki Sarmanto.

In 1993, the University of Pittsburgh Sonny Rollins International Jazz Archives opened, established by Nathan Davis.

New York City Hall proclaimed November 13, 1995, to be "Sonny Rollins Day". Several days later, Rollins gave a performance at New York City's Beacon Theatre that reunited him with musicians with whom he had played as a teenager, including McLean, Walter Bishop Jr., Percy Heath, Connie Henry, and Gil Coggins.

In 1997, he was voted "Jazz Artist of the Year" in the DownBeat magazine critics' poll. The following year, Rollins, a dedicated advocate of environmentalism, released an album entitled Global Warming.

=== 2001–2014: Later career and retirement ===
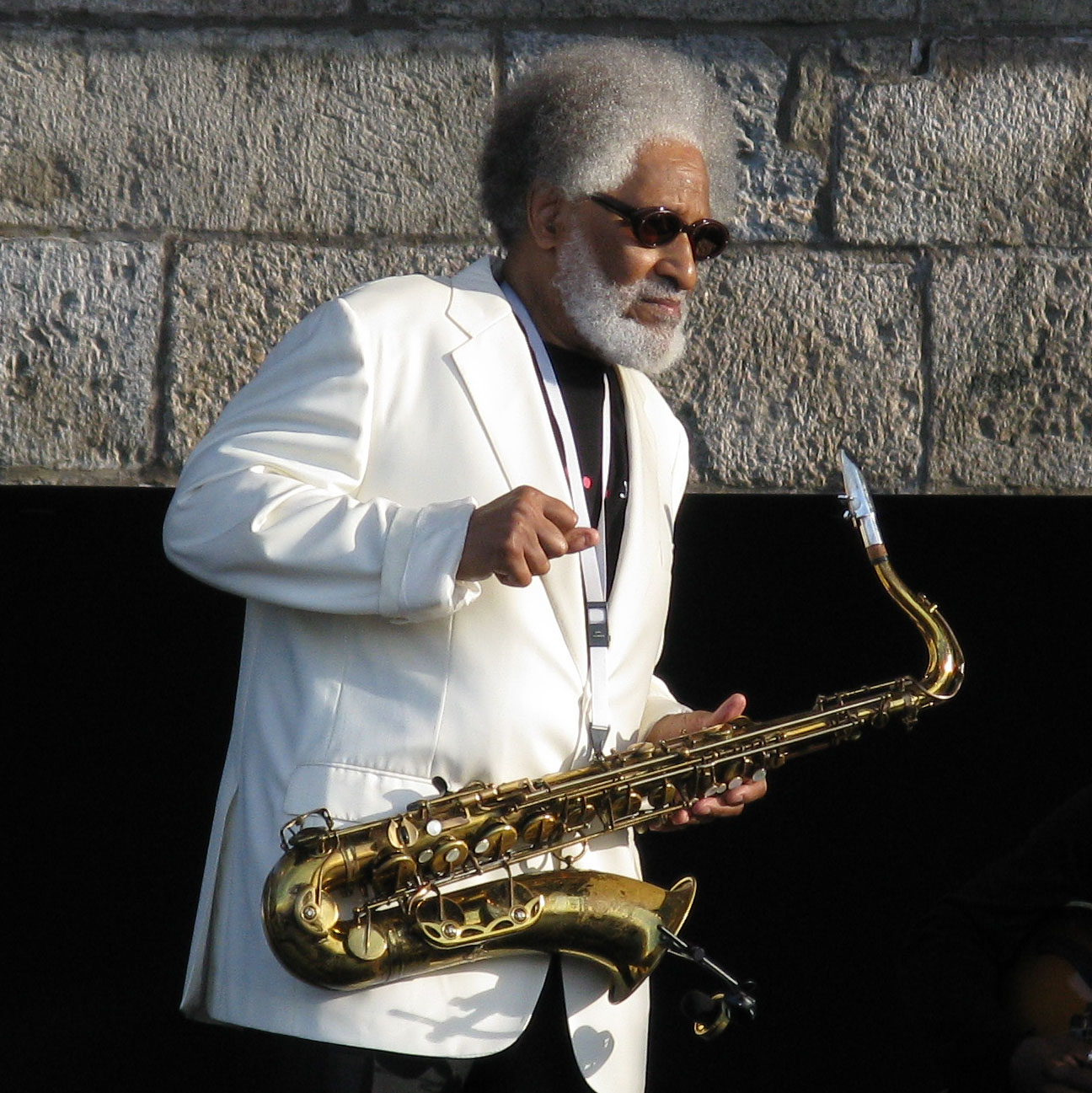
Rollins at the Newport Jazz Festival in 2008

Critics such as Gary Giddins and Stanley Crouch have noted the disparity between Rollins the recording artist, and Rollins the concert artist. In a May 2005 New Yorker profile, Crouch wrote of Rollins the concert artist:

Over and over, decade after decade, from the late seventies through the eighties and nineties, there he is, Sonny Rollins, the saxophone colossus, playing somewhere in the world, some afternoon or some eight o'clock somewhere, pursuing the combination of emotion, memory, thought, and aesthetic design with a command that allows him to achieve spontaneous grandiloquence. With its brass body, its pearl-button keys, its mouthpiece, and its cane reed, the horn becomes the vessel for the epic of Rollins's talent and the undimmed power and lore of his jazz ancestors.

Rollins won a 2002 Grammy Award for Best Jazz Instrumental Album for This Is What I Do (2000). On September 11, 2001, the 71-year-old Rollins heard the World Trade Center collapse from his Greenwich Street apartment only a few blocks away, and was forced to evacuate with only his saxophone in hand. Although he was shaken by the incident, he traveled to Boston four days later to play a scheduled concert at the Berklee Performance Center on September 15, during which he said to the audience: "We must remember that music is one of the beautiful things in life, so we have to try to keep the music alive in some kind of way. Maybe music can help; I don't know, but we have to try something these days." The live recording of that performance was released on CD in 2005 as Without a Song: The 9/11 Concert, from which Rollins's performance of "Why Was I Born?" won the 2006 Grammy Award for Jazz Instrumental Solo.

Rollins was presented with a Grammy Lifetime Achievement Award in 2004; that year also saw the death of his wife, Lucille, who had been his manager since 1971, and had become his co-producer a decade later.

In 2006, Rollins went on to complete a DownBeat Readers Poll triple win for "Jazzman of the Year", "No. 1 Tenor Sax Player", and "Recording of the Year" for the CD Without a Song: The 9/11 Concert. The band that year featured his nephew, trombonist Clifton Anderson, and included bassist Cranshaw, pianist Stephen Scott, percussionist Kimati Dinizulu, and drummer Perry Wilson.

After a successful Japanese tour, Rollins returned to the recording studio for the first time in five years to record the Grammy-nominated CD Sonny, Please (2006). The CD's title is derived from one of his wife's favorite phrases that she used to express exasperation. The album was released on Rollins's own label, Doxy Records, following his departure from Milestone Records after many years and was produced by Anderson. Rollins's band at this time, and on this album, included Cranshaw, guitarist Bobby Broom, drummer Steve Jordan, and Dinizulu.

During these years, Rollins regularly toured worldwide, playing major venues throughout Europe, South America, the Far East, and Australasia; he is estimated to have sometimes earned as much as $100,000 per performance. On September 18, 2007, he played at Carnegie Hall in commemoration of the fiftieth anniversary of his first performance there. Appearing with him were Anderson (trombone), Bobby Broom (guitar), Cranshaw (bass), Dinizulu (percussion), Roy Haynes (drums), and Christian McBride (bass).

Around 2000, Rollins began recording many of his live performances; after that he archived recordings of more than 250 concerts. To date, four albums have been released from these archives on Doxy Records and Okeh Records: Road Shows, Vol. 1; Road Shows, Vol. 2 (with four tracks documenting his 80th birthday concert, which included Rollins's first ever recorded appearance with Ornette Coleman on the 20-minute "Sonnymoon for Two"); Road Shows, Vol. 3; and Holding the Stage, Road Shows, Vol. 4, released in April 2016.

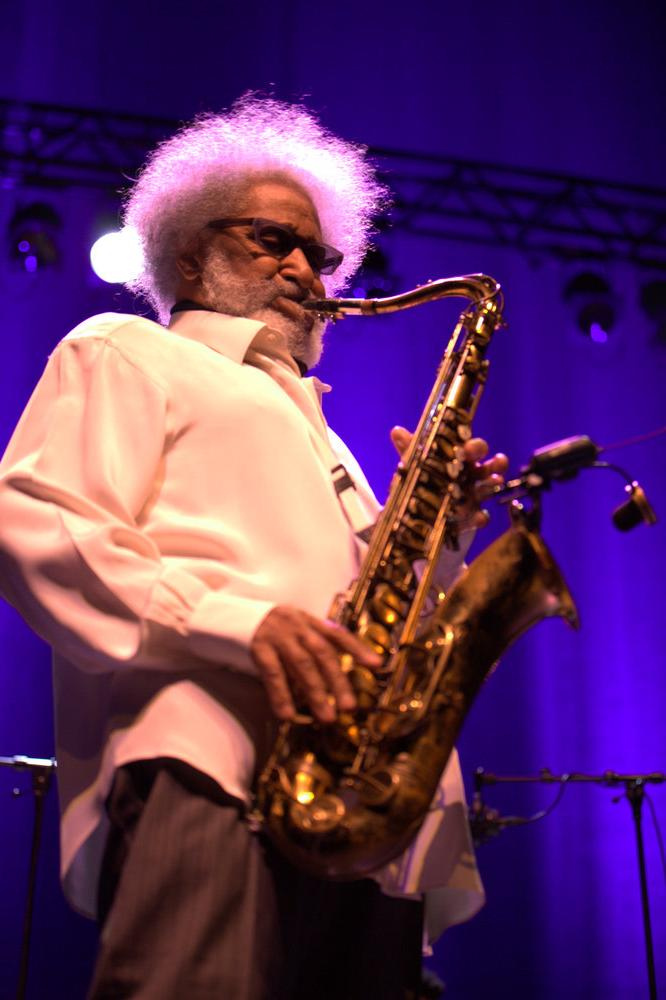
Rollins in 2011

In 2010, Rollins was awarded the National Medal of Arts and the Edward MacDowell Medal; in the fall of the same year, he celebrated his 80th birthday with a concert at New York's Beacon Theatre that included a guest appearance by Ornette Coleman, and additionally, in November 2010, Rollins performed in the London Jazz Festival to an audience of more than 1,900 at the Barbican Hall (where he was also a regular headline act in previous years). In 2011, he was a Kennedy Center Honoree in a class with Meryl Streep, Yo-Yo Ma, Barbara Cook, and Neil Diamond. The following year, Rollins was the subject of another documentary by Dick Fontaine, entitled Beyond the Notes, which premiered on the BBC Four television series Arena in February 2012. In November 2012, Rollins again played at the Barbican Centre, ending his two-hour set with the comment: "It's great to be back in London" – UK Jazz News later noted that "Rollins's affiliation with the capital goes back decades, from the nights he spent holed up in Ronnie’s working on the film score for 'Alfie', right through to the twilight years of his career, where he can sell out one of the city's largest concert halls many months in advance to an audience that goes from seated to full standing ovation in under five seconds."

Rollins did not publicly perform after 2012, due to recurring respiratory issues caused by pulmonary fibrosis. He announced his retirement in 2014.

=== Other activities ===
In 2013, Rollins made a guest television appearance on The Simpsons in the episode "Whiskey Business", and received an honorary Doctor of Music degree from the Juilliard School in New York City.

In 2014, he was the subject of a Dutch television documentary, Sonny Rollins – Morgen Speel Ik Beter ("Tomorrow I'll Play Better"). He made a public appearance in June of that year introducing saxophonist Ornette Coleman at an all-star tribute performance to Coleman in Brooklyn, New York. In October 2015, Rollins received the Jazz Foundation of America's lifetime achievement award.

In the spring of 2017, Rollins donated his personal archive to the Schomburg Center for Research in Black Culture, one of the research centers of New York Public Library. The collection includes correspondence, diaries, recordings of practice sessions, photographs, and other material, documenting Rollins's life and career from the 1950s.

Later in 2017, he endowed the Sonny Rollins Jazz Ensemble Fund at Oberlin College, in what journalist Erich Burnett described as "recognition of the institution's long legacy of access and social justice advocacy." Aligned with his belief in giving back, Rollins wanted to make a major gift to one of the institutions that had awarded him honorary doctorates, and his choice followed correspondence with writer and musician James McBride, a 1979 graduate of Oberlin. The "Sonny scholars" accepted for the ensemble also undertook work with some community service projects; Rollins stated, "You have to live by the Golden Rule. Let's say these Oberlin students repay wherever they got this great musical gift from, that's what I always wanted to do. ... They're not just going to have a successful life just playing music and being exceptional players. That's not enough. This is how I would like the world to be like this and there's no reason it can't be like this."

In February 2023, Rollins sold his music catalogue to Reservoir Media. In April 2024, New York Review Books published The Notebooks of Sonny Rollins (edited and with an introduction by Sam V. H. Reese), derived from notebooks Rollins maintained from 1959 onwards.

== Personal life and death ==
Rollins was married twice. He was briefly married to Dawn Finney in 1957. He met his next wife, Lucille Pearson, that same year, and they married in 1965. They remained together until her death in 2004.

He lived in New York City, six blocks from the World Trade Center. During the September 11 attacks, they were evacuated to upstate New York with Rollins carrying only his saxophone. In 2013, Rollins moved to Woodstock, New York.

Rollins died at his home in Woodstock on May 25, 2026, at the age of 95. He had been experiencing several health issues including pulmonary fibrosis.

== Influence, artistry and legacy ==
Rollins is widely recognized as one of the most important and influential jazz musicians. A number of his compositions, including "St. Thomas", "Oleo", "Doxy", and "Airegin", have become jazz standards. Rollins was often called "the greatest living improviser".

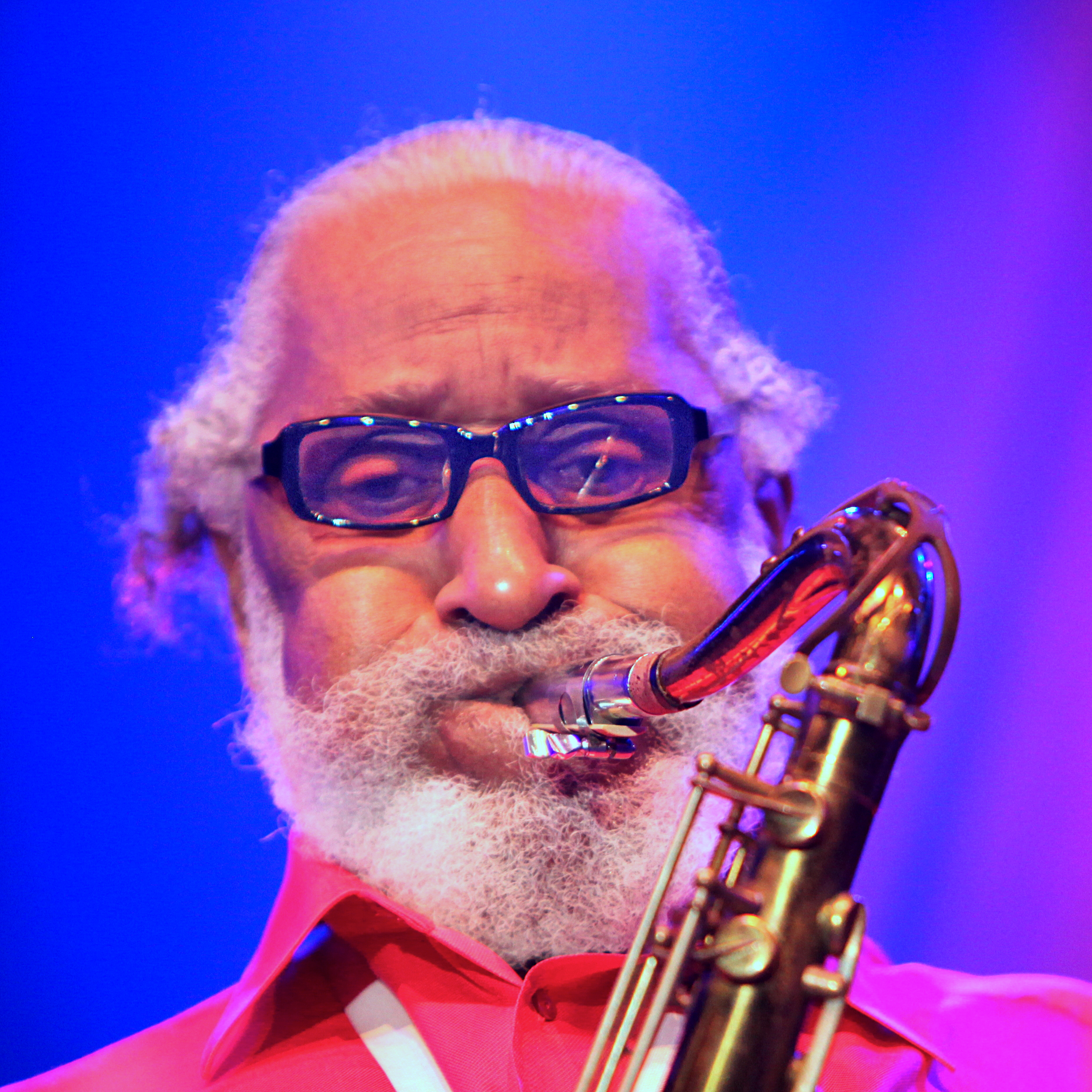
Rollins at the Stockholm Jazz Festival, 2009

In performance, Rollins was noted for long solos. He told PBS that he would take to the stage with his mind blank and with no plan beyond an awareness of the structure of the piece. "Improvising on it, that I leave completely to the forces", he said. "Sometimes I'm surprised by what comes out."

Rollins played, at various times, a Selmer Mark VI and a Buescher Aristocrat tenor saxophone. During the 1970s, he recorded on soprano saxophone for the album Easy Living. His preferred mouthpieces were made by Otto Link and Berg Larsen. He used Frederick Hemke medium reeds.

Rollins's tone has been described as "biting and clear". As a saxophonist, he had initially been attracted to the jump and R&B sounds of performers such as Louis Jordan, but soon became drawn into the mainstream tenor saxophone tradition. The German critic Joachim-Ernst Berendt described this tradition as sitting between the two poles of the strong sonority of Coleman Hawkins and the light flexible phrasing of Lester Young, which did so much to inspire the fleet improvisation of bebop in the 1950s. His other tenor saxophone influences include Ben Webster and Don Byas. By his mid-teens, Rollins became heavily influenced by alto saxophonist Charlie Parker. During his high school years, he was mentored by the pianist and composer Thelonious Monk, often rehearsing at Monk's apartment.

In 2011, President Barack Obama presented Rollins with the 2010 National Medal of Arts. Obama said Rollins had inspired him to "take risks that I might not otherwise have taken". Fellow saxophonist Branford Marsalis described Rollins, alongside Louis Armstrong, as "the greatest improviser in the history of jazz".

Following his death, Rollins was noted for his impact in jazz music. PBS called Rollins the "restless genius of jazz". The New York Times, in their obituary of Rollins, credited him as the "Giant of the Jazz Saxophone" and said that his "forceful and imaginative approach" to the tenor saxophone made him one of the "dominant jazz musicians of the post-World War II era". He was called the "saxophone colossus". The BBC noted his long musical solos and considered Rollins among the best improvisers in the music industry. Rolling Stone magazine said that Rollins "redefined the language of the [jazz] genre" with his improvisational skills. Rollins was called a "groundbreaking" voice of jazz in Variety magazine's obituary of him. The Hollywood Reporter credited him as "one of the most important and influential musicians of all time".

== Honors and awards ==
- Elected to the DownBeat Jazz Hall of Fame (1973)
- Honorary Doctor of Arts from Bard College (1992)
- Honorary Doctor of Music from Wesleyan University (1998)
- Honorary Doctor of Music from Long Island University (1998)
- Honorary Doctor of Music from Duke University (1999)
- Honorary Doctor of Music from New England Conservatory of Music (2002)
- Honorary Doctor of Music from Berklee College of Music (2003)
- Grammy Lifetime Achievement Award (2004)
- Golden Plate Award of the American Academy of Achievement presented by Awards Council member Kareem Abdul-Jabbar (2006)
- Minneapolis City Council in Minnesota passed an official resolution, on October 31, 2006, naming Rollins in honor of his achievements and contributions to the world of jazz
- Polar Music Prize "for over 50 years one of the most powerful and personal voices in jazz" (2007)
- Honorary Doctor of Music from Colby College (2007)
- Austrian Cross of Honour for Science and Art, 1st class (2009)
- Honorary Doctor of Music from Rutgers University (2009)
- National Medal of Arts (2010)
- Miles Davis Award at the Montreal Jazz Festival (2010)
- Elected to the American Academy of Arts and Sciences (2010)
- Edward MacDowell Medal (2010)
- Kennedy Center Honors on his 81st birthday (September 7, 2011)
- Honorary Doctor of Music from the Juilliard School (May 2013)
- Honorary Doctor of Music from the University of Hartford (2015)

== See also ==
- List of people from Harlem
