= List of tribute albums =

This is a list of tribute albums, organized according to the original artists.

== A ==
- ABBA
  - Abba-esque (Erasure, 1992)
  - ABBAmania (1999)
  - The ABBA Generation (1999)
  - A Tribute to ABBA (2001)
  - Dancing Queen (2018)
  - Masters of the Scene: The Definitive ABBA Tribute (2003)
  - Take a Chance - A Metal Tribute to ABBA (Amberian Dawn) (2024)
- Accept
  - A Tribute to Accept
  - A Tribute to Accept II
  - Accept Metal or Die: A Tribute to Accept
- AC/DC
  - Fusebox – The Alternative Tribute (1995)
  - Thunderbolt: A Tribute to AC/DC (1998)
  - A Hillbilly Tribute to AC/DC (performed by Hayseed Dixie), (2001)
  - Graveyard Classics 2 (performed by Six Feet Under) (2004)
- Acidman
  - Acidman Tribute Works
- Aerosmith
  - Not The Same Old Song And Dance: A Tribute To Aerosmith (1999)
  - Let the Tribute Do the Talkin' – Tribute to Aerosmith (2014)
  - Right in the Nuts: A Tribute to Aerosmith (2000)
  - One Way Street: A Tribute to Aerosmith (2002)
- Alice Cooperi
  - Welcome to Our Nightmare: A Tribute To Alice Cooper (1993)
  - Humanary Stew: A Tribute to Alice Cooper (1999)
- Steve Allen
  - The Time of My Life: Roseanna Vitro Sings the Songs of Steve Allen
- The Allman Brothers Band
  - Midnight Rider – Tribute to The Allman Brothers Band
- Alter Bridge
  - String Tribute to Alter Bridge (2011)
- John Anderson
  - Something Borrowed, Something New: A Tribute to John Anderson (2022)
- Anthrax
  - Indians... Not! Brazilian tribute to Anthrax (2007)
  - Caught in Time: A Tribute to Anthrax (2012)
  - String Tribute to Anthrax
- Asian Kung-Fu Generation
  - AKG Tribute (2017)
- Avenged Sevenfold
  - Hail to the Kings: A Tribute to Avenged Sevenfold (2018)

== B ==
- Bad Brains
  - Never Give In: A Tribute to Bad Brains (1999)
- Bad Company
  - Can't Get Enough: A Tribute to Bad Company (2025)
- Bad Religion
  - Germs Of Perfection: A Tribute To Bad Religion (2010)
- Chet Baker
  - Chet Baker Re:imagined (2025)
- The Band
  - Endless Highway: The Music of The Band (2007)
  - Garth Hudson Presents A Canadian Celebration Of The Band (2010)
- Syd Barrett
  - Beyond the Wildwood (1987)
  - Mojo Presents: The Madcap Laughs Again! (2010)
- The Beatles
  - The Chipmunks sing the Beatles Hits (1964)
  - McLemore Avenue (Booker T. & the M.G.'s, 1970)
  - The Other Side of Abbey Road (George Benson, 1970)
  - All This and World War II (original soundtrack, 1976)
  - Sgt. Pepper's Lonely Hearts Club Band (original soundtrack, 1978)
  - Let It Be (Laibach, 1988)
  - Come Together: America Salutes The Beatles (1995)
  - In My Life (George Martin, 1998)
  - I Am Sam (original soundtrack, 2001)
  - The Persuasions Sing The Beatles (The Persuasions, 2002)
  - When They Was Fab – a Tribute to the Solo Beatles (Hallmark, 2002)
  - This Bird Has Flown – A 40th Anniversary Tribute to the Beatles' Rubber Soul (2005)
  - Mojo Presents: Revolver Reloaded (2006)
  - Across the Universe (original soundtrack, 2007)
  - Meet The Smithereens! (2007)
  - Mojo Presents: Sgt. Pepper... With a Little Help From His Friends (2007)
  - Blackbird: The Music of Lennon and McCartney (Katie Noonan, 2008)
  - Mojo Presents: The White Album Recovered (2008)
  - Imagine That (original soundtrack, 2009)
  - Mojo Presents: Abbey Road Now! (2009)
  - "Help!" The Story of Eleanor Rigby and Billy Shears (Overboard, 2009)
  - Sgt. Pepper Live (Cheap Trick, 2009)
  - Mojo Presents: Let It Be Revisited (2010)
  - Mojo Presents: Yellow Submarine Resurfaces (2012)
  - Top Musicians Play The Beatles (2012)
  - Sgt. Pepper's Lonely Hearts Club Band (Art of Time Ensemble, 2013)
  - Mojo Presents: We're With the Beatles (2013)
  - With a Little Help from My Fwends (The Flaming Lips, 2014)
  - Keep Calm and Salute The Beatles (2015)
  - Looking Through You: A 50th Anniversary Tribute to the Beatles' Rubber Soul (2015)
  - Tomorrow Never Knows: A 50th Anniversary Tribute to the Beatles' Revolver (2015)
- Big Star
  - Big Star, Small World (2006)
- Björk
  - Enjoyed: A Tribute to Björk's Post (2008)
- Black Sabbath
  - Nativity in Black (1994)
  - Tribute to Black Sabbath: Eternal Masters (1994)
  - Masters of Misery – Black Sabbath: The Earache Tribute (1997)
  - Nativity in Black II (2000)
  - Nativity in Black III (2003)
  - Hands of Doom – A Tribute to Black Sabbath (2013)
- Art Blakey
  - Tony Allen A Tribute To Art Blakey & The Jazz Messengers (2017)
- Bleachers
  - Terrible Thrills, Vol. 2 (2015)
- Blind Guardian
  - Tales From the Underworld (2003)
- Blue Note Records
  - Blue Note Re:imagined (2020)
- James Blundell
  - 30 Years of Pride: A Tribute to James Blundell
- David Bowie
  - Only Bowie (1995)
  - Crash Course for the Raves: A Tribute to David Bowie (1996)
  - David Bowie Songbook (1997)
  - Ashes to Ashes: A Tribute to David Bowie (1999)
  - Goth Oddity: A Tribute to David Bowie (1999)
  - The Dark Side of David Bowie (2000)
  - The String Quartet Tribute to David Bowie (2002)
  - Sound + Vision: The Electronic Tribute to David Bowie (2002)
  - Starman (Uncut Magazine) (2003)
  - A Classic Rock Tribute to Bowie by The Classic Rock String Quartet (2004)
  - 2. Contamination: A Tribute to David Bowie (2006)
  - Oh You Pretty Things: Songs of David Bowie (2006)
  - Spiders from Venus
  - Bowiemania: Tribute to David Bowie (2007)
  - David Bowie Acoustic Tribute (2007)
  - Tribute to David Bowie (2007)
  - We Were So Turned On: A Tribute to David Bowie (2010)
  - Twinkle Twinkle Little Rock Star: Lullabye Version of David Bowie (2010)
  - House of David (Lea DeLaria) (2015)
  - Let All the Children Boogie: A Tribute to David Bowie (2015)
  - A Salute to the Thin White Duke – The Songs of David Bowie (2015)
  - Many Faces of David Bowie (2016)
  - Loving the Alien (A Low Budget Tribute to David Bowie) (2017)
  - Bowiesongs1 (2017)
- Garth Brooks
  - The Complete Tribute to Garth Brooks (2003)
- Jackson Browne
  - Looking Into You: A Tribute to Jackson Browne (2014)
- Buck-Tick
  - Parade -Respective Tracks of Buck-Tick- (2005)
  - Parade II -Respective Tracks of Buck-Tick- (2012)
  - Parade III -Respective Tracks of Buck-Tick- (2020)

== C ==
- Andrés Calamaro
  - Calamaro querido! Cantando al salmón (2006)
- J.J. Cale
  - Eric Clapton The Breeze: An Appreciation of JJ Cale (2014)
- Cardiacs
  - Leader of the Starry Skies: A Tribute to Tim Smith, Songbook 1 (2010)
  - Singin' to God (2018)
- Brandi Carlile
  - Cover Stories (2017)
- The Carpenters
  - If I Were a Carpenter (1994)
- The Cars
  - Substitution Mass Confusion: A Tribute to The Cars (2005)
- Cartoon Theme Songs
  - Saturday Morning: Cartoons' Greatest Hits (various artists, 1995)
- Peter Case
  - A Case For Case: A Tribute To The Songs Of Peter Case (various artists, 2006)
- Johnny Cash
  - Kindred Spirits: A Tribute to the Songs of Johnny Cash (2002)
  - We Walk the Line: A Celebration of the Music of Johnny Cash (2012)
- Harry Chapin
  - Harry Chapin Tribute (1990)
- Ray Charles
  - Shirley Horn Light Out of Darkness (A Tribute to Ray Charles) (1993)
  - Catchin' Some Rays: The Music of Ray Charles (1997)
  - Here We Go Again: Celebrating the Genius of Ray Charles (2011)
- Cheap Trick
  - Cheap Dream: A Tribute to Cheap Trick
- Vic Chesnutt
  - Sweet Relief II: Gravity of the Situation (1996)
- The Clash
  - The Clash Tribute: The Never Ending Story (Part 1) (various artists, 1991)
  - Burning London: The Clash Tribute (various artists, 1999)
  - City Rockers: A Tribute To The Clash (various artists, 2002)
  - This Is Rockabilly Clash (various artists, 2002)
  - White Riot: A Tribute to The Clash Vols 1 & 2 (various artists, 2003)
  - Charlie Does Surf (A Tribute to The Clash) (various artists, 2004)
  - The Sandinista! Project: A Tribute to The Clash) (various artists, 2007)
- Bruce Cockburn
  - Kick at the Darkness
- Leonard Cohen
  - Famous Blue Raincoat (Jennifer Warnes, 1987)
  - I'm Your Fan (1991)
  - Tower of Song (1995)
  - Leonard Cohen: I'm Your Man (film soundtrack, 2006)
- Cold Chisel
  - Standing On The Outside: The Songs Of Cold Chisel (2007)
- Cy Coleman
  - The Best Is Yet to Come: The Songs of Cy Coleman (2009)
- Judy Collins
  - Born to the Breed: A Tribute to Judy Collins (2008)
- Phil Collins
  - Urban Renewal: Featuring the Songs of Phil Collins (2001)
- Noël Coward
  - Twentieth-Century Blues: The Songs of Noël Coward (1998)
- The Cure
  - Our Voices – A Tribute to the Cure (2004)
  - Perfect as Cats (2008)

== D ==
- The Damned
  - Children of the Damned (1996)
- Daniel Amos & Terry Scott Taylor
  - When Worlds Collide (1999)
- Miles Davis
  - Freddie Hubbard Blues for Miles (1992)
  - Keith Jarrett Bye Bye Blackbird (1993)
  - Joe Henderson So Near, So Far (Musings for Miles) (1993)
  - Benny Golson I Remember Miles (1993)
  - A Tribute to Miles (1994)
  - Shirley Horn I Remember Miles (1998)
  - Freddie Hubbard At Jazz Jamboree Warszawa '91: A Tribute to Miles (2000)
  - Jimmy Cobb, George Coleman, Mike Stern, Ron Carter Four Generations of Miles: A Live Tribute to Miles (2002)
  - Marcus Miller Tutu Revisited – Live 2010 (2011)
- dc Talk
  - Freaked!
- Deep Purple
  - Cactus Jack Deep Purple Tribute (2003)
  - Funky Junction Play a Tribute to Deep Purple (1973)
- Def Leppard
  - Leppardmania: A Tribute to Def Leppard (2000)
  - Tributized: Tribute to Def Leppard (2000)
  - Matt Nathanson Pyromattia (2018)
- Sandy Denny
  - Vikki Clayton: It Suits Me Well – The Songs Of Sandy Denny (1994)
  - No Grey Faith (Iain Matthews' project): Secrets all Told – The Songs of Sandy Denny (2000)
  - Continental Drifters: Listen, Listen (2001)
- John Denver
  - The Music Is You: A Tribute to John Denver
  - Great Voices Sing John Denver
  - Rocky Mountain Memories – An Instrumental Tribute to John Denver
- Depeche Mode
  - I Sometimes Wish I Was Famous: A Swedish Tribute to Depeche Mode
  - For the Masses
  - Color Theory presents Depeche Mode
  - Destruction Time Again (Tribute to Depeche Mode + Recoil) by Louis Guidone
- D'erlanger
  - D'erlanger Tribute Album: Stairway to Heaven (2017)
- Dwiki Dharmawan
  - Collaborating Harmony: Dwiki Dharmawan (2014)
- Ronnie James Dio
  - Dio (2010)
  - Holy Dio: Tribute to Ronnie James Dio (2000)
  - Ronnie James Dio – This Is Your Life (2014)
- Disney
  - Stay Awake: Various Interpretations of Music from Vintage Disney Films (1988)
- The Doors
  - Stoned Immaculate: The Music of the Doors (2000)
- Dragon Ash
  - 25 -A Tribute To Dragon Ash- (2022)
- Dream Theater
  - Voices: A Tribute to Dream Theater (1999)
- Duran Duran
  - The Best of Duran Duran (1993)
  - The Duran Duran Tribute Album (1997)
  - Glue: a tribute to the Music of Duran Duran (1999)
  - The Songs of Duran Duran UnDone (1999)
  - Studio 99: Duran Duran Tribute (2000)
  - A Tribute to Duran Duran (2003)
  - Electrotrash Undone: A Tribute To Duran Duran (2004)
  - The String Quartet Tribute to Duran Duran (2004)
  - Piano Tribute to Duran Duran (2011)
  - Making Patterns Rhyme: A Tribute to Duran Duran (2014)
- Dustbox
  - Timeless Melodies -A Tribute to Dustbox- (2024)
- Bob Dylan
  - Tangled Up In Blues: Songs of Bob Dylan (1996)
  - A Nod to Bob: Tribute to Bob Dylan on His Sixtieth Birthday (2001)
  - Is it Rolling Bob? A Reggae Tribute to Bob Dylan (2004)
  - Les Fradkin "If Your Memory Serves You Well" (2006)
  - I'm Not There (film soundtrack, 2007)
  - Chimes of Freedom: The Songs of Bob Dylan Honoring 50 Years of Amnesty International (2012)

== E ==
- Eagles
  - Common Thread: The Songs of the Eagles (1993)
- Eddie Fisher
  - You Ain't Heard Nothin' Yet (1968)
- Edward Kennedy "Duke" Ellington
  - Toshiko Akiyoshi Jazz Orchestra Tribute to Duke Ellington (1999)
- Eraserheads
  - Ultraelectromagneticjam!: The Music of the Eraserheads (2005)
  - The Reunion: An Eraserheads Tribute Album (2012)
  - Pop Machine the Album (2020)
  - Cutterpillow: Tribute Album (2025)
- Roky Erickson
  - Where the Pyramid Meets the Eye: A Tribute to Roky Erickson (1990, 2017)
  - May the Circle Remain Unbroken: A Tribute to Roky Erickson (2021)
- Bill Evans
  - VA Bill Evans – A tribute (1983)
  - Roseanna Vitro Conviction: Thoughts of Bill Evans (2001)
- Gil Evans
  - The Gil Evans Orchestra Tribute To Gil (1989)
- Eyehategod
  - For the Sick (2006)

== F ==
- Fats Domino
  - Goin' Home: A Tribute to Fats Domino (2007)
- Finch
  - A Tribute to Finch (2026)
- Finn Brothers
  - She Will Have Her Way (2005)
  - He Will Have His Way (2010)
- Clare Fischer
  - Clarity: Music of Clare Fischer
- Fleetwood Mac
  - Legacy: A Tribute to Fleetwood Mac's Rumours (1998)
  - Just Tell Me That You Want Me: A Tribute to Fleetwood Mac (2012)
- Foreigner
  - Tribute to Foreigner (2002)

== G ==
- Peter Gabriel
  - Leaves from the Tree: A Tribute to Peter Gabriel (2001)
  - And I'll Scratch Yours (2013)
- Serge Gainsbourg
  - Monsieur Gainsbourg Revisited
- Galaxie 500
  - Snowstorm
- Genesis
  - Genesis for two Grand Pianos Vol. I (2000), Vol. II (2004)
  - After Genesis: The Cryme of Selling Lambs (2004)
  - Rewiring Genesis: A Tribute to The Lamb Lies Down On Broadway (2008)
- GG Allin
  - Hated in the Cosmos: A Stellar Tribute to GG Allin (2019)
- Jean-Jacques Goldman
  - Génération Goldman (2012)
- Steve Goodman
  - My Old Man (2006)
- Granrodeo
  - Granrodeo Tribute Album "Rodeo Freak" (2020)
- The Grateful Dead
  - Deadicated: A Tribute to the Grateful Dead (1991)
  - Pickin' on the Grateful Dead: A Tribute (1997)
  - Might As Well...The Persuasions Sing Grateful Dead (2000; Arista/Grateful Dead)
  - Day of the Dead (2016)
- Green Day
  - Kerrang! Does Green Day's American Idiot (2014)
  - Kerrang!’s Green Day American Superhits (2016)
  - Gilman Street's Ripoff (2017)

== H ==
- Sammy Hagar
  - Three Lock Box: A Millenium Tribute to Sammy Hagar (2006)
- Merle Haggard
  - Mama's Hungry Eyes: A Tribute to Merle Haggard (1994)
- Tom T. Hall
  - Real: The Tom T. Hall Project (1998)
- George Harrison
  - George Fest (2016)
- Mark Heard
  - Orphans of God (1996)
  - Strong Hand of Love (1994)
- Joe Henderson
  - Renee Rosnes Black Narcissus: A Tribute to Joe Henderson (2008)
- Jimi Hendrix
  - Stone Free: A Tribute to Jimi Hendrix (1993)
  - Power of Soul: A Tribute to Jimi Hendrix (2004)
- Kristin Hersh
  - Hot Hands: A Tribute to Throwing Muses & Kristin Hersh (2003)
- hide
  - hide Tribute Spirits (1999)
  - hide Tribute II -Visual Spirits- (2013)
  - hide Tribute III -Visual Spirits- (2013)
  - hide Tribute IV -Classical Spirits- (2013)
  - hide Tribute VI -Female Spirits- (2013)
  - hide Tribute VII -Rock Spirits- (2013)
  - hide Tribute Impulse (2018)
- Buddy Holly
  - I Remember Buddy Holly (1963)
  - Listen to Me: Buddy Holly (2011)
  - Rave On Buddy Holly (2011)
  - The Buddy Holly Country Tribute: Remember Me (2014)

== I ==
- Ikimonogakari
  - Ikimonogakari meets
- Iron Maiden
  - See: Music in tribute of Iron Maiden

== J ==
- Michael Jackson
  - Never Can Say Goodbye: The Music of Michael Jackson
  - Rava on the Dance Floor
  - Thriller: A Metal Tribute to Michael Jackson
  - Unity: The Latin Tribute to Michael Jackson
  - Trijntje Oosterhuis: Never Can Say Goodbye
- Wanda Jackson
  - Hard Headed Woman: A Celebration of Wanda Jackson (2004)
- The Jam
  - Fire and Skill: The Songs of the Jam (1999)
- Jandek
  - Naked in the Afternoon: A Tribute to Jandek (2000)
  - Down in a Mirror: A Second Tribute to Jandek (2005)
- Jawbreaker
  - Bad Scene, Everyone's Fault (2003)
- Elton John
  - Two Rooms: Celebrating the Songs of Elton John and Bernie Taupin (1991)
  - Revamp: Reimagining the Songs of Elton John & Bernie Taupin (2018)
  - Restoration: Reimagining the Songs of Elton John and Bernie Taupin (2018)
- Robert Johnson
  - Me and Mr. Johnson (performed by Eric Clapton, 2004)
  - Todd Rundgren's Johnson (performed by Todd Rundgren, 2011)
- Journey
  - An '80s Metal Tribute to Journey (2006)
- Joy Division
  - A Means to an End: The Music of Joy Division
- Judas Priest
  - A Tribute to Judas Priest: Legends of Metal (1997)
  - A Tribute to Judas Priest, Vol. 2: Delivering the Goods (2000)
  - A Tribute to the Priest (2002, Nuclear Blast)
  - Hell Bent Forever: A Tribute to Judas Priest (2008)

== K ==
- Kerbdog
  - Pledge: A Tribute to Kerbdog (2010)
- Carole King
  - Tapestry Revisited: A Tribute to Carole King (1995)
- The Kinks (The Kinks tribute albums)
  - Shangri-La – A Tribute to The Kinks (1989)
  - Give the People What We Want: Songs of The Kinks (2001)
  - This Is Where I Belong: The Songs of Ray Davies and The Kinks (2002)
  - The Modern Genius of Ray Davies (MOJO magazine CD) (2006)
  - Kontroversial Kovers (2013)
- Kirsty MacColl
  - A Concert for Kirsty MacColl (2013)
- Kiss
  - Hard to Believe: Kiss Covers Compilation (1990)
  - Kiss My Ass: Classic Kiss Regrooved (1994)
  - Kiss My Grass: A Hillbilly Tribute to Kiss (performed by Hayseed Dixie) (2003)
  - Spin the Bottle – An All-Star Tribute to Kiss (2004)
  - KISS MY ANKH: A Tribute To Vinnie Vincent (2008)

== L ==
- L'Arc-en-Ciel
  - L'Arc-en-Ciel Tribute (2012)
- Avril Lavigne
  - A Tribute to Avril Lavigne (2003)
  - Boys on Top: A Punk Rock Tribute to Avril Lavigne (2004)
- Led Zeppelin
  - Encomium (1995)
  - Pickin' on Led Zeppelin, Vol. 1-2 (2003)
- Ledisi
  - Ledisi Sings Nina (2021)
  - For Dinah (2025)
- John Lennon
  - Working Class Hero: A Tribute to John Lennon (1995)
- Gordon Lightfoot
  - Beautiful: A Tribute to Gordon Lightfoot (2003)
- Love
  - We're All Normal and We Want Our Freedom – A Tribute to Arthur Lee and Love (1994)
- Low
  - Your Voice Is Not Enough (2024)
- Luna Sea
  - Luna Sea Memorial Cover Album -Re:birth- (2007)
- Jeff Lynne
  - Lynne Me Your Ears (2001)
- Lynyrd Skynyrd
  - Skynyrd Frynds (1994)

== M ==
- Marilyn Manson
  - Anthems of Rust and Decay: A Tribute to Marilyn Manson (2000)
  - Anonymous Messiah: A Tribute to Marilyn Manson (2001)
  - Tribute to Marilyn Manson (2002)
  - Salvation + Devotion: A Tribute to Marilyn Manson (2007)
  - The String Quartet Tribute to Marilyn Manson (2007) (performed by The Vitamin String Quartet)
- Curtis Mayfield
  - People Get Ready – A Tribute to Curtis Mayfield (1993)
  - A Tribute to Curtis Mayfield (1994)
  - I'm So Proud: A Jamaican Tribute to Curtis Mayfield (1997)
- Paul McCartney
  - The Art of McCartney (2014)
- Megadeth
  - Megaded: A Tribute to Megadeth (1999)
  - A Tribute to Megadeth – Gigadeath (2006)
  - This Is the News – The Tribute to Megadeth (2007)
  - Hangar of Souls: Tribute to Megadeth (2013)
- Metallica
  - A Garage Dayz Nite (performed by Beatallica)
  - Beatallica (performed by Beatallica)
  - A Tribute to Metallica (performed by Die Krupps) (1992)
  - Metal Militia: A Tribute to Metallica (1994)
  - Plays Metallica by Four Cellos (performed by Apocalyptica) (1996)
  - The Blackest Album: An Industrial Tribute to Metallica (1998)
  - Metallic Assault: A Tribute to Metallica (2001)
  - Overload: A Tribute To Metallica (1998)
  - A Punk Tribute to Metallica (2001)
  - A Tribute to the Four Horsemen (2002, re-issued in 2003 with a different track listing)
  - Metallic Attack: The Ultimate Tribute (2005)
  - Sgt. Hetfield's Motorbreath Pub Band (performed by Beatallica) (2007)
  - Pianotarium: Piano Tribute to Metallica (performed by Scott D. Davis) (2007)
  - Say Your Prayers, Little One: The String Quartet Tribute to Metallica (performed by The Vitamin String Quartet)
- Midnight Oil
  - The Power & The Passion (2001)
- Minor Threat
  - Un Tributo a Minor Threat (1997)
- The Mission
  - A Tribute to the Mission – Forevermore (1999)
- Joni Mitchell
  - Back to the Garden (1992)
  - River: The Joni Letters (2007)
  - A Tribute to Joni Mitchell (2007)
- Mongol800
  - 800Tribute -champloo is the Best!!- (2014)
  - 800Tribute -champloo is the Best!!2- (2023)
- Thelonious Monk
  - A tribute to Monk and Bird (1978)
- The Moody Blues
  - Justin Hayward and Friends Sing the Moody Blues Classic Hits (1996)
  - Moody Bluegrass: A Nashville Tribute to The Moody Blues (2004)
  - Moody Bluegrass TWO... Much Love (2011)
- Yukinojo Mori
  - Words of Yukinojo (2006)
- Van Morrison
  - No Prima Donna: The Songs of Van Morrison (1994)
  - Vanthology: A Tribute to Van Morrison (2003)
  - The Van Morrison Songbook (1997)
- Mötley Crüe
  - Nashville Outlaws: A Tribute to Mötley Crüe (2014)
- Mucc
  - Tribute of Mucc -en- (2017)
- Gerry Mulligan
  - The Gerry Mulligan Songbook (1997)
- The Muppets
  - Muppets: The Green Album (2011)

== N ==
- Nationalteatern
  - Nationalsånger – Hymner från Vågen och EPAs torg
- Randy Newman
  - Nilsson Sings Newman (1970)
  - The Music of Randy Newman
- Harry Nilsson
  - For The Love of Harry: Everybody Sings Nilsson (1995)
  - I'll Never Leave You: A Tribute to Harry Nilsson (2005)
  - This is the Town: A Tribute to Nilsson, Vol. 1 (2014)
- Nine Inch Nails
  - Covered in Nails: A Tribute to Nine Inch Nails (2000)
  - Re-Covered in Nails: A Tribute to Nine Inch Nails (2001)
  - Closer to the Spiral: A Tribute to Nine Inch Nails (2001)
  - The Broken Machine: A Tribute to Nine Inch Nails (2001)
  - Absence of Faith: The Tribute to Nine Inch Nails (2002)
  - The String Quartet Tribute to Nine Inch Nails (2002) (performed by The Vitamin String Quartet)
  - A Tribute to Nine Inch Nails (2004)
  - The Piano Tribute to Nine Inch Nails (2005)
  - Gothic Acoustic Tribute to Nine Inch Nails (2005)
  - Radiant Decay: A Tribute to Nine Inch Nails (2007)
  - The String Quartet Tribute to Nine Inch Nails' Pretty Hate Machine (2007)
  - Pretty Eight Machine (2012)
- Nirvana
  - Smells Like Bleach: A Punk Tribute to Nirvana (2001)
  - Nevermind Tribute (2012)
- NRBQ
  - The Q People – A Tribute To NRBQ (2004)
- Ted Nugent
  - Bulletproof Tribute: Ted Nugent Tribute (2001)
  - Tribute to Ted Nugent: Cat Scratch Fever (2005)

== O ==
- Oingo Boingo
  - Dead Bands Party: A Tribute to Oingo Boingo (2005)
- Orchestral Manoeuvres in the Dark
  - Messages: Modern Synthpop Artists Cover OMD (2001)
  - Pretending to See the Future: A Tribute to OMD (2001)
- Ozzy Osbourne
  - Bat Head Soup: A Tribute to Ozzy (2000)

== P ==
- Charlie Parker
  - A tribute to Monk and Bird (1978)
- Pantera
  - Southern Death: Tribute to Pantera (2000)
  - The Art of Shredding: A Tribute to Dime (2006)
- Gram Parsons
  - Conmemorativo: A Tribute To Gram Parsons (1993)
  - Return of the Grievous Angel: A Tribute to Gram Parsons (1999)
- Dolly Parton
  - Just Because I'm a Woman: Songs of Dolly Parton (2003)
  - The Dolly Songbook (Cliona Hagan; 2021)
- Pet Shop Boys
  - Very Introspective, Actually – A Tribute to The Pet Shop Boys (2001)
  - Goes Petshopping (2006)
- Tom Petty
  - You Got Lucky: A Tribute to Tom Petty (1994)
- Phish
  - Sharin' in the Groove: Celebrating the Music of Phish (2000)
- The Pillows
  - Synchronized Rockers (2005)
- Pink Floyd
  - Back Against The Wall (by Billy Sherwood and a host of various artists, 2005)
  - Dub Side of the Moon (2003)
  - Dubber Side of the Moon (2008)
  - The Flaming Lips and Stardeath and White Dwarfs with Henry Rollins and Peaches Doing The Dark Side of the Moon (2009)
  - Rebuild the Wall (by Luther Wright and the Wrongs, 2001)
  - Return to the Dark Side of the Moon (Three albums with this name, the latest released in Mojo (magazine) in 2011)
  - The Many Faces Of Pink Floyd (A Journey Through The Inner World Of Pink Floyd) (2013)
- Pixies
  - Where Is My Mind? Tribute to the Pixies (1999)
  - Pixies Fuckin' Die! (1999)
  - La La Love You Pixies!! (2004)
- The Police
  - Policia!: A Tribute to the Police
- Iggy Pop
  - We Will Fall: The Iggy Pop Tribute (1997)
- Cozy Powell
  - Cozy Powell Forever
- Los Prisioneros
  - Tributo a Los Prisioneros (2000)
- Prince
  - Purplish Rain (2009)

== Q ==
- Queen
  - Dragon Attack: A Tribute to Queen (1997)
  - Killer Queen: A Tribute to Queen (2005)
- Queens of the Stone Age
  - A Tribute to Queens of the Stone Age (2004)
  - The String Quartet Tribute to Queens of the Stone Age: Strings for the Deaf (2004)
- Queensrÿche
  - Rebellion: Tribute to Queensrÿche (2000)
  - Warning, Minds of Raging Empires, Vol. 1: A Tribute to Queensryche (2001)

== R ==
- Radiohead
  - Exit Music: Songs with Radio Heads (2006)
  - Radiodread (2006)
  - OKX (2007)
- Radwimps
  - Dear Jubilee: Radwimps Tribute
- Raffi
  - Country Goes Raffi (2001)
- Ramones
  - Ramones (1992)
  - Rocket To Russia (1994)
  - Rocket to Ramonia (1996)
  - File Under Ramones (1999)
  - We're A Happy Family – A Tribute To The Ramones (2003)
- Lou Reed
  - What Goes On (The Songs Of Lou Reed)(2021)
- R.E.M.
  - Drive XV: A Tribute to Automatic for the People (2007)
  - Surprise Your Pig: A Tribute to R.E.M. (1992)
- Rheostatics
  - The Secret Sessions (2007)
- Roxy Music
  - Dream Home Heartaches...Remaking/Remodeling Roxy Music (1997)
- Rottengraffty
  - Rottengraffty Tribute Album: Mouse Trap (2019)
- Rush
  - Working Man – A Tribute to Rush (1996)
  - Red Star: Tribute to Rush (1999)
  - Subdivisions: A Tribute to Rush (2005)
  - New World Man: A Tribute to Rush (2010)
- The Rutles
  - Rutles Highway Revisited (1990)

== S ==
- Saxon
  - A Metal Crusade: Tribute to Saxon (2001)
- Savatage
  - Return of the Mountain King (2000)
- Adam Schlesinger
  - Saving for a Custom Van (2020)
- Schoolhouse Rock!
  - Schoolhouse Rock! Rocks (1996)
- Scooter
  - The Gutter Techno Experience: A Tribute to the Gods of Hardcore, Scooter (2005)
- Scorpions
  - Covered Like a Hurricane: A tribute to Scorpions (2000)
  - A Tribute To The Scorpions (2001)
  - Another Piece Of Metal: Tribute To Scorpions (2001)
- Selena
  - Selena ¡VIVE! (2005)
- Sepultura
  - World of Pain (1999)
  - Sepulchral Feast (2001)
- The Shaggs
  - Better than the Beatles (2001)
- Sick of It All
  - Our Impact Will Be Felt
- Sid
  - Sid Tribute Album -Anime Songs- (2023)
- Frank Sinatra
  - Manilow Sings Sinatra (1998)
  - Bolton Swings Sinatra (2006)
- Slayer
  - Gateway to Hell (1999)
  - Gateway to Hell 2 (2000)
  - Hell at Last (2003)
  - Slatanic Slaughter (1995)
  - Slatanic Slaughter II (1996)
  - Straight to Hell (1999)
- Slowdive
  - Blue Skied an' Clear (2002)
- Tony Sly
  - The Songs of Tony Sly: A Tribute (2013)
- The Smashing Pumpkins
  - Ghost Children: A Tribute To The Smashing Pumpkins (2001)
  - A Gothic-Industrial Tribute to The Smashing Pumpkins (2001)
  - Midnight in the Patch: Tribute to the Smashing Pumpkins (2001)
  - The Killer in You: A Tribute to Smashing Pumpkins (2005)
  - Ghost Children/Friends and Enemies (2006)
- Elliott Smith
  - The String Quartet Tribute to Elliott Smith (2004)
  - A Tribute to Elliott Smith (2005)
  - Remote Memory: A Tribute to Elliot Smith (2006)
  - To Elliott, From Portland (2006)
  - Home to Oblivion: An Elliott Smith Tribute (2006)
  - Coming Up Roses: Sacramento Remembers Elliott Smith (2007)
  - Say Yes! A Tribute to Elliott Smith (2016)
- The Smiths
  - The Smiths Is Dead (1996)
- Snot
  - Strait Up – a Tribute to Lynn Strait (2000)
- Stephen Sondheim
  - Liaisons: Re-Imagining Sondheim from the Piano (2015)
- Dusty Springfield
  - Shelby Lynne: Just a Little Lovin' (2008)
- Joe Strummer
  - Shatter the Hotel: A Dub Inspired Tribute to Joe Strummer (various artists, 2009)
- Styx
  - A Tribute to Styx (2002)
- Suicidal Tendencies
  - Suicide In Venice (2000)
- Sukima Switch
  - Sukima Switch 20th Anniversary Tribute Album "Minna no Sukima Switch" (2024)
- Taylor Swift
  - 1989 (Ryan Adams, 2015)

== T ==
- Talking Heads
  - Everyone's Getting Involved: A Tribute to Talking Heads' Stop Making Sense
  - Live Phish Volume 15
- Steve Taylor
  - I Predict A Clone
- Teresa Teng
  - Decadent Sound of Faye (1995)
  - A Tribute to Teresa Teng (1995)
- Terry Scott Taylor & Daniel Amos
  - When Worlds Collide (1999)
- Testament
  - Jump In The Pit (2000)
- They Might Be Giants
  - Hello Radio: Songs of They Might Be Giants (2006)
- Throwing Muses
  - Hot Hands: A Tribute to Throwing Muses & Kristin Hersh (2003)
- Richard Thompson
  - The World Is A Wonderful Place: The Songs Of Richard Thompson (1993)
  - Beat the Retreat: Songs by Richard Thompson (1995)
  - Continental Drifters: Listen, Listen (2001)
- Tokyo Ska Paradise Orchestra
  - Tokyo Ska Paradise Orchestra Tribute Shū: Rakuen Jyusan Kei (2019)
- Tullycraft
  - First String Teenage High: The Songs of Tullycraft Played By People Who Aren't (2003)
  - Wish I'd Kept A Scrapbook: A Tribute to Tullycraft (2010)
- Turbonegro
  - Alpha Motherfuckers: A Tribute to Turbonegro (2001)
- Twin Peaks
  - Plays the Music of Twin Peaks (2016)
- Twisted Sister
  - Destroyer: Tribute To Twisted Sister (2001)
  - Twisted Forever (2001)
- Tally Hall
  - We Think We're Playing In A Band: A Tribute to Tally Hall (2015)
- Twenty One Pilots
  - Blurryface Reborn (2025)

== U ==
- U2
  - We Will Follow: A Tribute to U2 (1998)
  - Pride: The Royal Philharmonic Orchestra Plays U2 (1999)
  - With or Without You (2000)
  - AHK-toong BAY-bi Covered (2011)
  - U2 Electronic tribute: blue sky vertigo (Electron Love Theory) (2010)
- UFO
  - Lights Out: The Ultimate Tribute to UFO (2006)
- Unison Square Garden
  - Thank you, Rock Bands!: Unison Square Garden 15th Anniversary Tribute Album (2019)
- Hikaru Utada
  - Utada Hikaru no Uta (2014)

== V ==
- Van Halen
  - Everybody Wants Some: A Loose Interpretation of the Musical Genius of Van Halen (1997)
  - Little Guitars: A Tribute to Van Halen (2000)
  - Runnin' With the Devil: A Tribute to Van Halen (2000)
  - Best of Both Worlds: A Tribute to Van Halen (2003)
  - 80's Metal Tribute to Van Halen (2006)
  - Strummin' with the Devil: The Southern Side of Van Halen (2006)
- Stevie Ray Vaughan
  - A Tribute to Stevie Ray Vaughan (1996)
- The Velvet Underground
  - Fifteen Minutes – A Tribute to the Velvet Underground (1994)
- Venom
  - A Tribute to Venom – In the Name of Satan (1994)
  - Promoters of the Third World War – A Tribute to Venom (1997)
  - In The Sign Of The Horns (2000)
  - Mayhem without Mercy – A Hardcore Punkrock Tribute to Venom (2003)
  - Gods of Goats – A Tribute to Venom (2007)
  - A Tribute to Venom (Sigh, 2008)

== W ==
- W.A.S.P.
  - Show No Mercy: Tribute To WASP (2001)
- Tom Waits
  - Step Right Up: The Songs of Tom Waits (1995)
  - Anywhere I Lay My Head (2008)
  - Grapefruit Moon: The Songs of Tom Waits (Southside Johnny) (2008)
- Weezer
  - Rock Music: A Tribute to Weezer (2002)
  - Engine Room Recordings Presents: A Tribute to Pinkerton (2012)
- Kurt Weill
  - Lost In The Stars (1985)
- the Wiggles
  - ReWiggled - A Tribute to the Wiggles (2011)
  - ReWiggled (2022)
- White Zombie
  - Super-Charger Hell (2000)
- Whitesnake
  - Still Of The Night: A Millennium Tribute to Whitesnake (2013)
- Keith Whitley
  - Keith Whitley: A Tribute Album (1994)
- The Who
  - Who Covers Who? (1994)
  - Substitute: The Songs of The Who (2001)
- Victoria Williams
  - Sweet Relief: A Benefit for Victoria Williams (1993)
- John Williamson
  - Absolute Greatest: 40 Years True Blue (2010)
- Bob Wills
  - A Tribute to the Best Damn Fiddle Player in the World (or, My Salute to Bob Wills) (1970)
  - Salute the Majesty of Bob Wills (performed by the Pine Valley Cosmonauts with guest vocalists) (1998)
- Brian Wilson
  - Making God Smile: An Artists' Tribute to the Songs of Beach Boy Brian Wilson (2002)

== X ==
- XTC
  - A Testimonial Dinner: The Songs of XTC (1995)

== Y ==
- Yes
  - Tales from Yesterday (1995)
- Neil Young
  - The Bridge: A Tribute to Neil Young (1991)
  - Borrowed Tunes: A Tribute to Neil Young (1994)
  - Borrowed Tunes II: A Tribute to Neil Young (2007)

== Z ==
- Frank Zappa
  - Frankly A Cappella: The Persuasions sing Zappa (2000)
- Warren Zevon
  - Enjoy Every Sandwich: The Songs of Warren Zevon
- Rob Zombie
  - The Electro-Industrial Tribute to Rob Zombie (2002)
- ZZ Top
  - ZZ Top: A Tribute from Friends (2011)
  - Sharp Dressed Men: A Tribute to ZZ Top (2002)

== See also ==
- Lists of albums
- Pickin' On…, a series of tribute albums performed in the bluegrass style
