= Magical Mystery Tour (disambiguation) =

Magical Mystery Tour is a 1967 LP and double EP by the Beatles.

Magical Mystery Tour may also refer to:

- "Magical Mystery Tour" (song), a song by the Beatles
- Magical Mystery Tour (film), an hour-long television film that initially aired in 1967

== See also ==
- Masterful Mystery Tour, an album by Beatallica
