= Pickin' On =

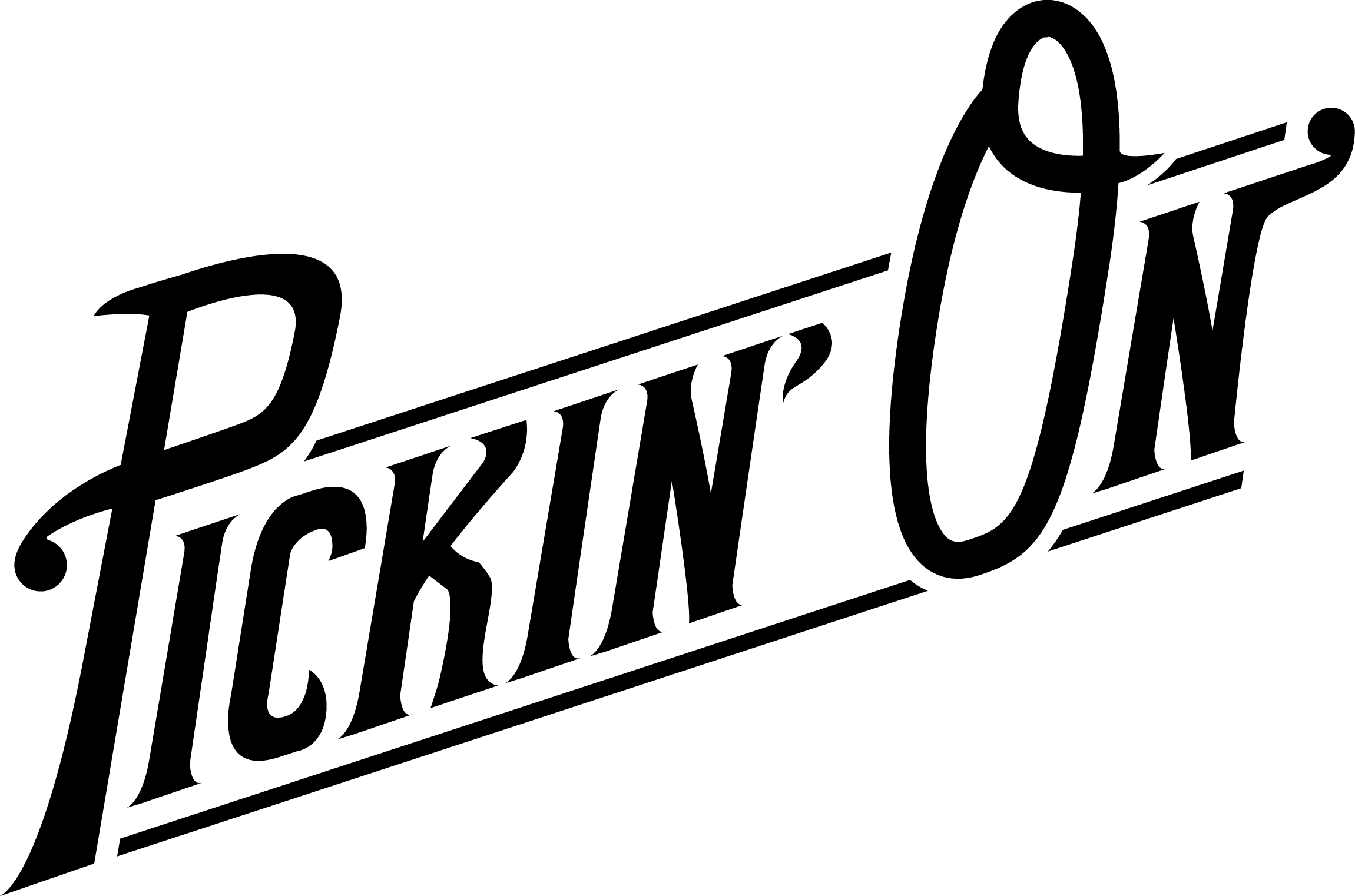

Background information
- Origin: Los Angeles, California, United States
- Genres: Country; bluegrass
- Years active: 1993–present
- Label: CMH
- Website: www.cmhrecords.com

Pickin' On is a series of rock and country tribute albums performed in a bluegrass style. The records are released by CMH Records.

The albums are recorded by bluegrass studio musicians for example Dennis Caplinger playing all instruments on ten tracks on the Pickin' On Lee Ann Rimes album.

== Discography ==
Original Artist	Album title	Year
3 Doors Down	Pickin' On 3 Doors Down	2007
AC/DC	Back in Bluegrass: The Bluegrass Tribute to AC/DC	2005
Aerosmith	Pickin' On Aerosmith	2000
Aerosmith	Pick Your Wings: The Bluegrass Tribute to Aerosmith (Ft. Cornbread Red)	2008
Air	Blue Safari: Pickin' On Air (Ft. Old School Freight Train)	2005
Alabama	Pickin' On Alabama	2004
Alan Jackson	Pickin' On Alan Jackson	2002
All-American Rejects	Bluegrass Tribute to All-American Rejects	2006
Allman Brothers	Pickin' On the Allman Brothers	2000
Avett Brothers	The Bluegrass Tribute to the Avett Brothers	2011
Barenaked Ladies	Pinch My Bluegrass: The Bluegrass Tribute to Barenaked Ladies	2006
Beach Boys	Pickin' On The Beach Boys	2004
The Beatles	Pickin' On The Beatles	1994
The Beatles	Pickin' On The Beatles Vol. 2	1999
Beck	Pickin' On Beck	2005
The Black Crowes	Pickin' On The Black Crowes	2002
The Black Keys	The Bluegrass Tribute to The Black Keys	2011
Black Label Society	Life, Birth, Blue, Grass: The Bluegrass Tribute to Black Label Society (Ft. Iron Horse)	2006
Blake Shelton	Pickin' On Blake Shelton: A Bluegrass Tribute - Bar Light	2005
Blink-182	Grass Stains: A Bluegrass Tribute to blink-182	2003
Blues Traveler	Pickin' On Blues Traveler	2002
Bob Dylan	Pickin' On Dylan	1999
Bob Marley	Jamming: Bluegrass Celebrates Bob Marley	2001
Bon Jovi	Nice Life: Bluegrass Tribute to Bon Jovi	2006
Boston	Smokin': The Bluegrass Tribute to Boston	2000
Brad Paisley	Pickin' On Brad Paisley	2003
Brooks & Dunn	Pickin' On Brooks & Dunn	2002
Bruce Springsteen	Pickin' on Springsteen	1999
Bruce Springsteen	Pickin' on Bruce Springsteen Vol. 2	2003
The Byrds	Eight Miles High: A Bluegrass Tribute to The Byrds	2001
Clint Black	Pickin' On Clint Black	2004
Coldplay	Pickin' on Coldplay: A Bluegrass Tribute	2005
Counting Crows	Pickin' On Counting Crows	2007
Creed	Pickin' on Creed	2001
Creedence Clearwater Revival	Pickin' on Creedence Clearwater Revival	1999
Crosby, Stills, Nash, & Young	Pickin' on Crosby, Stills, Nash & Young	2000
Crosby, Stills, Nash, & Young	Pickin' on Crosby, Stills, Nash & Young Vol. 2	2002
Darius Rucker and Hootie & The Blowfish	The Bluegrass Tribute to Darius Rucker & Hootie & The Blowfish	2011
Dave Matthews Band	Breathe: The Bluegrass Tribute to Dave Matthews Band	2001
Dave Matthews Band	Breathe, Vol. 2: The Bluegrass Tribute to Dave Matthews Band	2003
Def Leppard	Pickin' On Def Leppard	2005
Dolly Parton	Pickin' On Dolly Parton	2003
The Doobie Brothers	Pickin' on the Doobie Brothers	2001
Dwight Yoakam	Pickin' On Dwight Yoakam	2004
The Eagles	Pickin' On The Eagles	1994
Eric Clapton	Pickin' On Clapton	1999
Elton John	Captain Fantastic: A Tribute to Elton John	1998
Faith Hill	Pickin' On Faith Hill	2001
Foo Fighters	Bleed It Out: The Bluegrass Tribute to Foo Fighters	2007
Franz Ferdinand	Pickin' On Franz Ferdinand (Ft. Cornbread Red)	2005
Garth Brooks	Pickin' On Garth Brooks	2000
Garth Brooks	Pickin' & Singin': The Bluegrass Tribute to Garth Brooks	2008
George Strait	Pickin' On George Strait	2000
Gov't Mule	Pickin' On Gov't Mule	2004
Grateful Dead	Pickin' on the Grateful Dead: A Tribute	1997
Grateful Dead	Pickin' on the Grateful Dead, Vol. 2	2000
Green Day	Green Day Bluegrass: Pickin' on Green Day (Ft. Honeywagon and Cornbread Red)	2005
Green Day	Green Day Bluegrass Vol. 2	2010
Guns N' Roses	Take Me Home: The Bluegrass Tribute to Guns N' Roses (Ft. Iron Horse)	2007
Hank Williams Jr.	Pickin' On Hank Williams Jr.	2004
Jack Johnson	Pickin' On Jack Johnson	2003
Jack White	The Bluegrass Tribute to Jack White	2012
Jerry Garcia	Pickin' On Jerry Garcia	2001
Johnny Cash	Pickin' On Johnny Cash	2006
Jimi Hendrix	Pickin' On Hendrix	1999
Jimmy Buffett	Pickin' On Jimmy Buffett	2000
John Cougar Mellencamp	Ain't That America: The Bluegrass Tribute to John Cougar Mellencamp	2000
John Denver	Rocky Mountain High: A Tribute to John Denver	1997
John Mayer	Pickin' On John Mayer	2003
Journey	Bluegrass Tribute to Journey	2008
Kanye West	The Bluegrass Tribute to Kanye West's Heartless (Ft. Iron Horse)	2010
Keith Urban	Pickin' On Keith Urban	2003
Kenny Chesney	Pickin' On Kenny Chesney: The Fantastic Bluegrass Tribute	2002
Kenny Chesney	Pickin' On Kenny Chesney Vol. 2	2004
The Killers	The Bluegrass Tribute to The Killers	2006
Kings of Leon	The Bluegrass Tribute to Kings of Leon (Ft. Iron Horse)	2010
Led Zeppelin	Pickin' On Zeppelin	2000
Led Zeppelin	Pickin' On Led Zeppelin Vol. 2	2003
Lee Ann Womack	Pickin' On Lee Ann Womack	2002
Linkin Park	The Bluegrass Tribute to Linkin Park (Ft Cornbread Red)	2005
Lonestar	Pickin' On Lonestar	2002
Lynyrd Skynyrd	Pickin' on Lynyrd Skynyrd: A Tribute	1997
Maroon 5	Tangled In Maroon: The Bluegrass Tribute to Maroon 5	2007
Merle Haggard	Pickin' On Merle Haggard	2002
Metallica	Fade to Bluegrass: The Bluegrass Tribute to Metallica (Ft. Iron Horse)	2003
Metallica	Fade to Bluegrass Vol. 2: The Bluegrass Tribute to Metallica (Ft. Iron Horse)	2006
Modest Mouse	Pickin' on Modest Mouse (Ft. Iron Horse)	2004
Mötley Crüe	Bluegrass Tribute to Mötley Crüe	2007
Mumford and Sons	The Bluegrass Tribute to Mumford and Sons	2011
Mumford and Sons	Pickin' on Mumford and Sons' Babel	2012
Neil Young	Pickin' On Neil Young	1998
New Found Glory	Pickin' on New Found Glory	2006
Nirvana	Pickin' On Nirvana	2017
The Offspring	Americano: The Bluegrass Tribute to The Offspring	2007
Peter Frampton	Pickin' On Peter Frampton	2001
Phish	Gone Phishin': The Bluegrass Tribute to Phish	2000
Phish	Still Phishin': The Bluegrass Tribute to Phish, Vol. 2	2002
Pink Floyd	Pickin' on Pink Floyd	2001
Poison	Pick Your Poison: The Bluegrass Tribute to Poison	2007
Quentin Tarantino	Blood-Splattered Bluegrass: A Tribute to the Films of Quentin Tarantino	2011
Radiohead	Corporate Love Breakdown: The Bluegrass Tribute to Radiohead	2005
Randy Travis	Pickin' On Randy Travis	2003
Rascal Flatts	Pickin' On Rascal Flatts	2003
Reba McEntire	Pickin' On Reba McEntire	2002
Red Hot Chili Peppers	Pick My Kiss: The Bluegrass Tribute to Red Hot Chili Peppers	2006
R.E.M.	Pickin' on R.E.M.	2001
Relient K	Pickin' On Relient K	2007
The Rolling Stones	Pickin' On The Rolling Stones	2000
The Rolling Stones	Pickin' On The Rolling Stones Vol. 2	2003
The Rolling Stones	Paint It Blue: The Bluegrass Tribute to the Rolling Stones (Ft. Honeywagon)	2005
Santana	Pickin' On Santana	2000
Shania Twain	Pickin' on Shania Twain	2000
Sheryl Crow	Pickin' On Sheryl Crow	2001
The Shins	Pickin' on The Shins: A Tribute	2007
Simon & Garfunkel	Soundtrack to a Generation: Tribute to Simon & Garfunkel	1999
Stevie Ray Vaughan	Pickin' on Stevie Ray Vaughan: A Bluegrass Tribute	2001
String Cheese Incident	Pickin' On The String Cheese Incident	2002
The Strokes	Bluegrass Tribute to The Strokes	2006
Sugarland	We Drove All Night: Bluegrass Tribute to Sugarland	2006
Taking Back Sunday	Pickin' on Taking Back Sunday	2010
Taylor Swift	Pickin' & Singin': The Bluegrass Tribute to Taylor Swift	2008
Taylor Swift	Pickin' On Taylor Swift Vol. 2	2015
Tenacious D	This Is Just a Tribute: Bluegrass Wrecks the Music of Tenacious D (Ft. Dust Bowl Cavaliers)	2006
Tim McGraw	I Like It, I Love It: The Bluegrass Tribute to Tim McGraw	2001
Tim McGraw	Where The Bluegrass Grows: The Tribute to Tim McGraw (Ft. Billy Bob Thornton)	2006
Toby Keith	Pickin' On Toby Keith	2003
Tom Petty	Pickin' on Petty: A Bluegrass Tribute to Tom Petty	2000
Travis Tritt	Pickin' On Travis Tritt	2002
U2	Pickin' On U2	2001
U2	Pickin' On U2 Vol. 2	2003
Vince Gill	Pickin' On Vince Gill	2004
The White Stripes	Pickin' On The White Stripes	2005
The Who	Pickin' On The Who	2002
Widespread Panic	Pickin' on Widespread Panic: A Bluegrass Tribute	2001
Wilco	Pickin' on Wilco: Casino Side	2004
Willie Nelson	Pickin' On Willie Nelson	2003
ZZ Top	Pickin' on ZZ Top	2000
Various	Pickin' On The Movies	1993
Various	Four Finger Music: The Bluegrass Tribute to the Music Made Famous by The Simpsons	2007
Various	Heigh Ho Banjo: Bluegrass Salutes Favorite Disney Songs	1998
Various	The Fantastic Pickin' On Series Bluegrass Sampler	2002
Various	The Eclectic Bluegrass Collection	2006
Various	The Bluegrass Tribute to Classic Rock Hits (Ft Iron Horse & Conrbread Red)	2007
Various	The Bluegrass Tribute to The Hunger Games	2012
Various	Pickin' On The 90s	2016
