= Michelle (song) =

- Norwegian single picture sleeve

Song by the Beatles

from the album Rubber Soul
- Released: 3 December 1965
- Recorded: 3 November 1965
- Studio: EMI, London
- Genre: Pop; soft pop
- Length: 2:33 (mono); 2:40 (stereo)
- Label: Parlophone
- Songwriter: Lennon–McCartney
- Producer: George Martin

"Michelle" is a song by the English rock band the Beatles from their 1965 album Rubber Soul. It was composed principally by Paul McCartney, with the middle eight co-written with John Lennon. The song is a love ballad with part of its lyrics sung in French.

Following its inclusion on Rubber Soul, the song was released on an EP in France and in New Zealand, and as a single in several other European countries, in early 1966. It was a number 1 hit for the Beatles in Belgium, France, Italy, the Netherlands, Norway and New Zealand. Concurrent recordings of the song by David and Jonathan and the Overlanders were similarly successful in North America and Britain, respectively. "Michelle" won the Grammy Award for Song of the Year in 1967 and has since become one of the most widely recorded of all Beatles songs.

== Composition ==
The instrumental music of "Michelle" originated separately from the lyrical concept. According to McCartney:

"Michelle" was a tune that I'd written in Chet Atkins' finger-picking style. There is a song he did called "Trambone" with a repetitive top line, and he played a bass line while playing a melody. This was an innovation for us; even though classical guitarists had played it, no rock 'n' roll guitarists had played it. The first person we knew to use finger-picking style was Chet Atkins ... I never learned it. But based on Atkins' "Trambone", I wanted to write something with a melody and a bass line in it, so I did. I just had it as an instrumental in C.

The words and style of "Michelle" have their origins in the popularity of Parisian Left Bank culture during McCartney's Liverpool days. In his description, "it was at the time of people like Juliette Greco, the French bohemian thing." McCartney had gone to a party of art students where a student with a goatee and a striped T-shirt was singing a French song. He soon wrote a farcical imitation to entertain his friends that involved French-sounding groaning instead of real words. The song remained a party piece until 1965, when John Lennon suggested he rework it into a proper song for inclusion on Rubber Soul.

McCartney asked Jan Vaughan, a French teacher and the wife of his old friend Ivan Vaughan, to come up with a French name and a phrase that rhymed with it. McCartney said: "It was because I'd always thought that the song sounded French that I stuck with it. I can't speak French properly so that's why I needed help in sorting out the actual words."

Vaughan came up with "Michelle, ma belle", and a few days later McCartney asked for a translation of "these are words that go together well", rendered, for scansion, as sont des mots qui vont très bien ensemble ("are words that go very well together"). When McCartney played the song for Lennon, Lennon suggested the "I love you" bridge. Lennon was inspired by a song he heard the previous evening, Nina Simone's version of "I Put a Spell on You", which used the same phrase but with the emphasis on the last word, "I love you".

Each version of this song has a different length. The UK mono mix is 2:33 whereas the stereo version extends to 2:40 and the US mono is 2:43. The version available in The Beatles: Rock Band has a running time of 2:50.

== Musical structure ==
"Michelle"
The Beatles' "Michelle" from Rubber Soul

The song was initially composed in C, but was played in F on Rubber Soul (with a capo on the fifth fret). The verse opens with an F major chord ("Michelle" – melody note C) then the second chord (on "ma belle" – melody note D♭) is a B♭^{7♯9} (on the original demo in C, the second chord is a F^{7♯9}). McCartney called this second chord a "great ham-fisted jazz chord" that was taught to them by Jim Gretty who worked at Hessey's music shop in Whitechapel, central Liverpool and which George Harrison uses (as a G♭^{7♯9}) (see Dominant seventh sharp ninth chord) as the penultimate chord of his solo on "Till There Was You". After the E♭^{6} (of "these are words") there follows an ascent involving different inversions of the D dim chord. These progress from A♭dim on "go" – melody note F, bass note D; to Bdim (C♭dim) on "to" – melody note A♭, bass note D; to Ddim on "ge ..." – melody note B (C♭) bass note B; to Bdim on ... "ther ..." – melody note A♭ bass note B, till the dominant (V) chord (C major) is reached on "well" – melody note G bass note C.

George Martin, the Beatles' producer, recalled that he composed the melody of the guitar solo, which is heard midway through the song and again during the fadeout. He showed Harrison the notes during the recording session and then accompanied the guitarist (on piano, out of microphone range) when the solos were overdubbed. In terms of its complementary role to the main melody, musicologist Walter Everett likens this guitar part to two musical passages that Martin had arranged for singer Cilla Black the previous year: a bassoon–English horn combination on "Anyone Who Had a Heart" and the baritone electric guitar on "You're My World".

== Release ==
EMI's Parlophone label released Rubber Soul on 3 December 1965 in Britain, with "Michelle" sequenced as the final track on side one of the LP. The album was widely viewed as marking a significant progression within the Beatles' work and in the scope of pop music generally. Recalling the album's release for Mojo magazine in 2002, Richard Williams said "Michelle" represented "the biggest shock of all" to a contemporary pop audience, as McCartney conveyed "all his nostalgia for a safe childhood in the 1950s, itself a decade suffused with nostalgia for the inter-war security of the '20s and '30s, the era to which this song specifically refers."

Although no single from Rubber Soul was issued in Britain or America, "Michelle" was the most popular Rubber Soul track on US radio. (Note: In a 1987 interview, McCartney said that, as they had been with "Yesterday", the Beatles were reluctant to release "Michelle" as a single "because we didn't think it fitted our image ... They might have been perceived as Paul McCartney singles and maybe John wasn't too keen on that.") The song was released as a commercial single in several other countries. It topped charts in Italy (for eight weeks), the Netherlands (seven weeks), Sweden (five weeks), Hong Kong, Ireland, New Zealand and Singapore. In May 1966, Billboard's Hits of the World listed the song at number 1 in Argentina and Norway, among other countries. It was also number 1 in France for five weeks as the lead track on an EP release, since France continued to favour the extended-play format over singles.

At the 1967 Ivor Novello Awards, "Michelle" won in the category of "the Most Performed Work" of 1966, ahead of "Yesterday". "Michelle" won the Grammy Award for Song of the Year in 1967, against competition from "Born Free", "The Impossible Dream", "Somewhere, My Love" and "Strangers in the Night". In 1999, BMI named "Michelle" as the 42nd most performed song of the 20th century.

== Critical reception ==
In a contemporary review for the NME, Allen Evans described "Michelle" as a "memorable track" with a "bluesy French sound" in which McCartney's vocal was supported by "[the] others using voices as instruments". Record Mirror's reviewer admired the lyrics and said that the song was "just remotely, faintly, slightly similar to 'Yesterday' in the general approach" and "another stand-out performance". Eden of KRLA Beat described "Michelle" as a "beautiful ballad", adding: "Although it doesn't sound at all like his fantastic 'Yesterday', it is another tender love song, sung as only Paul could sing it. He even croons the choruses in French – and what better language for a love song?" Jazz critic and broadcaster Steve Race admitted being "astonished" by the album, and added "When I heard 'Michelle' I couldn't believe my ears. The second chord is an A-chord, while the note in the melody above is A-flat. This is an unforgivable clash, something no one brought up knowing older music could ever have done. It is entirely unique, a stroke of genius ... I suppose it was sheer musical ignorance that allowed John and Paul to do it, but it took incredible daring."

Among the Beatles' peers, Bob Dylan, whose work was especially influential on Lennon's and Harrison's songwriting on Rubber Soul, was dismissive of McCartney's ballad style. In March 1966, he said: "A song like 'Yesterday' or 'Michelle' ... it's such a cop-out, man ... if you go to the Library of Congress you can find a lot better than that. There are millions of songs like 'Yesterday' and 'Michelle' written in Tin Pan Alley." Levi Stubbs of the Four Tops, an American vocal group promoted in the UK by Beatles manager Brian Epstein, cited the song as an example of the sophistication the Beatles had introduced into pop music. He said that the US music scene had been "very dead-beat" and "stagnant" before the arrival of the British Invasion, after which: "Good music became accepted. Would 'Michelle' have been a hit before the Beatles? Of course not."

From 1970, McCartney's standing among music critics suffered as the authentic rock 'n' roll qualities personified by Lennon came to be valued over his former bandmate's more eclectic tastes. In his 1979 essay on the Beatles in The Rolling Stone Illustrated History of Rock & Roll, Greil Marcus said that Rubber Soul was the best of all the band's LPs and that "every cut was an inspiration, something new and remarkable in and of itself" except "Michelle", although he added, "to be fair, [it] paid the bills for years to come".

== Cover versions ==
"Michelle" was the most successful track from Rubber Soul for other recording artists and attracted dozens of cover versions within a year of its release. Author Peter Doggett lists it with "Yesterday" and several other Beatles compositions, mostly written by McCartney, that provided contemporary relevance for "light orchestras and crooners" in the easy listening category, persuaded adults that the new generation's musical tastes had merit and, by becoming some of the most widely recorded songs of all time, "ensured that Lennon and McCartney would become the highest-earning composers in history". (Note: The other songs cited by Doggett are "And I Love Her", "Eleanor Rigby", "Here, There and Everywhere", "The Fool on the Hill", "Hey Jude", "Let It Be" and "The Long and Winding Road".)

The song was a UK hit in January 1966 for the Overlanders, whose version topped the Record Retailer chart. It also reached number 2 in Australia. Signed to Pye Records, the Overlanders issued their recording after the Beatles had declined to release it as a single themselves in the United Kingdom and the United States. Pye and the Overlanders were given the Beatles' blessing because the record label had recently acquiesced to Epstein's request that they withdraw a single by Lennon's estranged father, Alf Lennon.

Bárbara y Dick had a hit in Argentina with the song which got in to the Argentine Top Ten in October 1966.

"Michelle" was also covered by David and Jonathan, whose version was produced by Martin. This recording went to number 1 in Canada and number 18 in the US, and was also a top 20 hit in Britain. Author Jon Savage writes that both the Overlanders' and David and Jonathan's versions were "mainstream pop songs, accentuating the very Beatles balladry that put off many hardcore fans"; he says this added to a perception that the Beatles had become "part of the Establishment" after receiving their MBEs from Queen Elizabeth II in October 1965. (Note: According to Savage, this perception was short-lived since the Beatles' activities from March 1966 onwards indicated a desire to depart from their image as pop stars, with no regard for their audience's expectations. After the Beatles released Revolver in August, the Overlanders called it "absolutely useless" and said that, despite their success with "Michelle", they would not consider recording any of the album's songs.) The Beatles version was not released as a single in North America.

American singer Billy Vaughn was another artist who recorded the song soon after its release. In his comments on the Lennon–McCartney composition, Steve Race remarked that Vaughn's arranger had altered the second chord to incorporate an A♭ note, thereby "taking all the sting out" of the unorthodox change. Race said this was indicative of how a formally trained arranger "was so attuned to the conventional way of thinking he didn't even hear what the boys had done".

Andy Williams covered the song on his 1966 album The Shadow of Your Smile. That same year, "Michelle" was one of Louis Andriessen's "Satirical Arrangements" of Beatles songs for singer Cathy Berberian. American jazz singer Sarah Vaughan also covered the song, while Matt Monro recorded it in 1973 with a string quartet. Instrumental versions were released by the Ventures, using a clavinet over the solo; Booker T. & the M.G.'s; and French bandleader Paul Mauriat, whose interpretation author John Kruth describes as "the most elegant Muzak version" of the song.

Italian singer Mango released an a cappella rendition of "Michelle" on his 2002 album Disincanto. The band Rubblebucket covered the song in 2010, a trip hop version that was included on their Triangular Daisies EP. Beatallica did a cover of the song incorporating the music from "For Whom the Bell Tolls" by Metallica. Titled "For Whom Michelle Tolls", the track appeared on their 2013 album Abbey Load.

In 1973, jazz vocal group The Singers Unlimited released an acapella version of "Michelle". This was later sampled in rap artist Masego's "Navajo". "Navajo"'s underlying instrumental was used in the 2021 song "Champagne Poetry" from Drake's album Certified Lover Boy.

Luther Vandross recorded a cover of "Michelle" in June 1989, and it remained unreleased until late 2024 for his greatest hits collection Never Too Much: Greatest Hits in conjunction of his documentary Luther: Never Too Much.

== In popular culture ==
The song inspired the title of the song "Michèle" by French singer Gérard Lenorman. Lenorman's song has even been mistaken for a cover of the Beatles' song.

== McCartney live performances ==
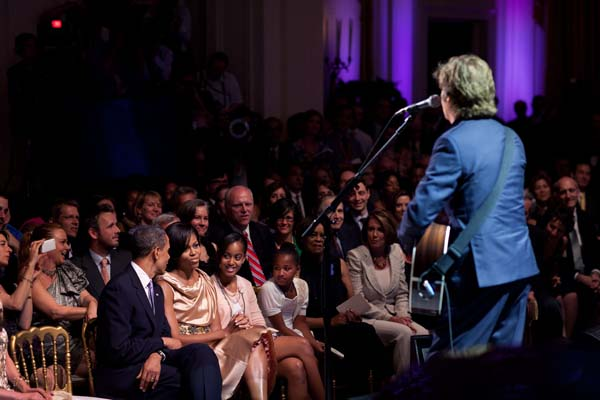
McCartney singing "Michelle" to Michelle Obama

"Michelle" was performed by McCartney throughout his 1993 world tour. He has rarely performed the song since, but did include it in a 2009 performance in Washington, DC, in honour of Michelle Obama, the American First Lady, and he would play it on most (if not all) of his performances in France or other francophone countries.

On 2 June 2010, after being awarded the Gershwin Prize for Popular Song by President Barack Obama in a ceremony at the White House, McCartney performed the song for Michelle Obama, who sang along from her seat. McCartney quipped, "I could be the first guy ever to be punched out by a president." Michelle Obama reportedly later told others that she could never have imagined, growing up an African-American girl on the South Side of Chicago, that someday a Beatle would sing "Michelle" to her as First Lady of the United States.

== Personnel ==
According to Walter Everett: (Note: Alternatively to Everett's line-up, Ian MacDonald wrote that "Michelle" was "made in nine hours and seems to have been played mostly, if not entirely, by McCartney using overdubs". He speculated that McCartney might even have sung the backing vocals and played the drums.)

- Paul McCartney – lead vocal, backing vocal, acoustic guitar, bass guitar
- John Lennon – backing vocal, classical guitar
- George Harrison – backing vocal, acoustic guitar, lead guitar
- Ringo Starr – drums

== Chart performance ==
=== Year-end charts ===
The Beatles

Chart (1966)	Peak position
Austria (Ö3 Austria Top 40)	3
Belgium (Ultratop 50 Flanders)	1
Denmark (Salgshitlisterne Top 20)	6
Finland (Suomen virallinen lista)	1
French EP charts	1
Italy (Musica e Dischi)	1
Netherlands (Dutch Top 40)	1
Netherlands (Single Top 100)	1
New Zealand (Listener)	1
Norway (VG-lista)	1
Sweden (Kvällstoppen)	1
Sweden (Tio i Topp)	1
West German Musikmarkt Hit-Parade	6

Billy Vaughn

Chart (1965–66)	Peak position
Canadian RPM Adult Contemporary	18
US Billboard Hot 100	77
US Billboard Easy Listening	17

Bud Shank

Chart (1966)	Peak position
US Billboard Hot 100	65
US Billboard Easy Listening	12

Spokesmen

Chart (1966)	Peak position
US Billboard Bubbling Under the Hot 100	106

David & Jonathan

Chart (1966)	Peak position
Australian Kent Music Report	42
Canada Top Singles (RPM)	1
Canada Adult Contemporary (RPM)	1
UK Record Retailer Chart	11
US Billboard Hot 100	18
US Billboard Easy Listening	3

Overlanders

Chart (1966)	Peak position
Australian (Kent Music Report)	2
Belgium (Ultratop 50 Flanders)	8
Ireland (IRMA)	5
Netherlands (Single Top 100)	1
Norway (VG-lista)	1
South Africa (Springbok Radio)	4
UK Record Retailer Chart	1
West German Musikmarkt Hit-Parade	18

Chart (1966)	Rank
Australia (KMR)	22

== Certifications and sales ==
Region	Certification	Certified units/sales
Norway (IFPI Norway)	Silver	25,000
United Kingdom (BPI)	Silver	200,000^{‡}
^{‡} Sales+streaming figures based on certification alone.

== Sources ==
- Clayson, Alan (2003). Paul McCartney. London: Sanctuary. ISBN 1-86074-486-9.
- Doggett, Peter (2015). Electric Shock: From the Gramophone to the iPhone – 125 Years of Pop Music. London: The Bodley Head. ISBN 978-1-84792-218-2.
- Everett, Walter (2001). The Beatles as Musicians: The Quarry Men through Rubber Soul. New York, NY: Oxford University Press. ISBN 0-19-514105-9.
- Frontani, Michael R. (2007). The Beatles: Image and the Media. Jackson, MS: University Press of Mississippi. ISBN 978-1-57806-966-8.
- Hertsgaard, Mark (1996). A Day in the Life: The Music and Artistry of the Beatles. London: Pan Books. ISBN 0-330-33891-9.
- Kruth, John (2015). This Bird Has Flown: The Enduring Beauty of Rubber Soul, Fifty Years On. Milwaukee, WI: Backbeat Books. ISBN 978-1-61713-573-6.
- Lewisohn, Mark (2005) [1988]. The Complete Beatles Recording Sessions: The Official Story of the Abbey Road Years 1962–1970. London: Bounty Books. ISBN 978-0-7537-2545-0.
- Madinger, Chip; Easter, Mark (2000). Eight Arms to Hold You: The Solo Beatles Compendium. Chesterfield, MO: 44.1 Productions. ISBN 0-615-11724-4.
- Marcus, Greil (1992) [1979]. "The Beatles". In DeCurtis, Anthony; Henke, James; George-Warren, Holly; Miller, Jim (eds.). The Rolling Stone Illustrated History of Rock & Roll: The Definitive History of the Most Important Artists and Their Music. New York, NY: Straight Arrow. ISBN 0-679-73728-6 – via greilmarcus.net.
- MacDonald, Ian (2005). Revolution in the Head: The Beatles' Records and the Sixties (2nd rev. ed.). Chicago, IL: Chicago Review Press. ISBN 978-1-55652-733-3.
- Miles, Barry (1997). Many Years from Now. New York, NY: Henry Holt and Company. ISBN 0-8050-5249-6.
- Miles, Barry (2001). The Beatles Diary Volume 1: The Beatles Years. London: Omnibus Press. ISBN 0-7119-8308-9.
- Pedler, Dominic (2003). The Songwriting Secrets of the Beatles. London: Omnibus Press. ISBN 978-0-7119-8167-6.
- Rodriguez, Robert (2012). Revolver: How the Beatles Reimagined Rock 'n' Roll. Milwaukee, WI: Backbeat Books. ISBN 978-1-61713-009-0.
- Savage, Jon (2015). 1966: The Year the Decade Exploded. London: Faber & Faber. ISBN 978-0-571-27763-6.
- Schaffner, Nicholas (1978). The Beatles Forever. New York, NY: McGraw-Hill. ISBN 0-07-055087-5.
- Sheff, David (2000) [1981]. All We Are Saying: The Last Major Interview with John Lennon and Yoko Ono. New York, NY: St. Martin's Press. ISBN 0-312-25464-4.
- Sullivan, Steve (2017). Encyclopedia of Great Popular Song Recordings, Volumes 3 & 4. Lanham, MD: Rowman & Littlefield. ISBN 978-1-4422-5448-0.
- Turner, Steve (2010). A Hard Day's Write: The Stories Behind Every Beatles Song. New York, NY: Harper Paperbacks. ISBN 978-0-06-084409-7.
- Turner, Steve (2016). Beatles '66: The Revolutionary Year. New York, NY: Ecco. ISBN 978-0-06-247558-9.
- Winn, John C. (2008). Way Beyond Compare: The Beatles' Recorded Legacy, Volume One, 1962–1965. New York, NY: Three Rivers Press. ISBN 978-0-307-45239-9.
