= Winter Plunderband =

EP by Beatallica
- Released: November 17, 2009
- Recorded: August–September 2009
- Genre: Comedy metal, thrash metal
- Length: 15:38
- Label: Oglio
- Producer: Beatallica and Flemball Rasmartin

Beatallica chronology
Masterful Mystery Tour (2009)	Winter Plunderband (2009)	Abbey Load (2013)

Song sample
- 30 seconds of "Hella Day for Holiday": file; help

Winter Plunderband, Beatallica's third extended play CD, was released on November 17, 2009. It is Beatallica's first ever Holiday Season release. The EP is only available at Beatallica live shows (very limited pressing) and can also be purchased as a digital download, which includes a digital booklet with artwork, lyrics (to the Beatallica songs) and over nineteen photos (including a handful of photos taken backstage on April 1, 2009, in Paris, France, with Beatallica and Metallica together).

The CD version does not contain any lyrics or photos, just the cover artwork and on the back there is artwork with a skeleton wearing a Santa Claus Hat on a snowy rooftop (from the Heretic lyrics page from the Digital Booklet) along with the song titles and production credits. The physical CD has an image of many skeleton reindeer that encircles the face of the CD, this imagery does not appear in the digital booklet when purchased as a digital download.

The songs included are covers of Paul McCartney's "Wonderful Christmastime" and John Lennon and Yoko Ono's "Happy Xmas (War Is Over)" and also the very first two Beatallica original songs: "Hella Day for Holiday" and "Heretic".

This is the first release by Beatallica that does not conform to their mash-up style that consists of music made from combinations of songs from the Beatles and Metallica.

The band played "Wonderful Christmastime", "Hella Day for Holiday" and "Happy Christmas (War Is Over)" live for the first time on November 25, 2009, at the Northern Lights Theater in Milwaukee, Wisconsin (official Winter Plunderband release party). This show was recorded live by the band for possible use in the future.

== Track listing ==
1. "Wonderful Christmastime" - 4:00
2. "Hella Day for Holiday" - 3:48
3. "Happy Christmas (War Is Over)" - 4:35
4. "Heretic" - 3:55

== Production ==
- Beatallica are: Jaymz Lennfield, Ringo Larz, Kliff McBurtney, Grg III
- Back up vox by the Skully Santa Singers: Jaymz, Kliff, Flemball, and Jessi
- Recorded by Flemball Rasmartin between Aug - Sept 2009 at Bobby Peru's Holiday Haunt, Milwaukee, WI:
- Produced by Beatallica and Flemball
- World contact and booking to beatallica@sbcglobal.net
- European booking to tanja@sittichbooking.com
- Art by Eric Von Munz
- Art manipulation by Anjl Rodee
- Art concept by Eric and Jaymz

== Winter Plunderband video chronicles ==
- Jaymz Announcement
- In Studio
- Jaymz on Wonderful Christmastime
- Jaymz on Hella Day For Holiday
- Jaymz on Happy Christmas (War Is Over)
- Jaymz on Heretic
- Winter Plunderband Commercial
