= Pickin' on Lynyrd Skynyrd: A Tribute =

Compilation album by Various artists
- Released: October 20, 1998
- Genre: Southern rock, bluegrass
- Label: CMH Records

Pickin' on Lynyrd Skynyrd: A Tribute is a tribute album by various bluegrass artists covering the songs of southern rock band Lynyrd Skynyrd. It is part of the Pickin' On… series.

Professional ratings
Review scores
Source	Rating
Allmusic	link

== Track listing ==
1. "That Smell" - 4:25
2. "Saturday Night Special" - 2:36
3. "Sweet Home Alabama" - 4:55
4. "I Know a Little" - 3:14
5. "You Got That Right" - 3:45
6. "Don't Ask Me No Questions" - 3:01
7. "Tuesday's Gone" - 3:47
8. "Call Me the Breeze" - 4:31
9. "What's Your Name" - 2:55
10. "The Needle and the Spoon" - 3:07
11. "Gimme Three Steps" - 3:09
12. "Free Bird" - 8:57
