= Abbey Load =

Studio album by Beatallica
- Released: 16 April 2013
- Genres: Hard rock; heavy metal
- Length: 38:04
- Label: Oglio
- Producers: Beatallica; Flemball Rasmartin

Beatallica chronology
Masterful Mystery Tour (2009)	Abbey Load (2013)

Professional ratings
Review scores
Source	Rating
Allmusic	3/5 stars

Abbey Load is the third studio album from Beatallica. It was released on 16 April 2013. It is the band's first studio album in over four years, since Masterful Mystery Tour was released in late 2009. The album's title was announced on 12 March 2013. Unlike the other Beatallica albums, the songs on this album have the original lyrics written by the Beatles, due to an imposition at Sony Music, the distributor of their label Oglio and owner of the Beatles' catalogue through Sony/ATV Music Publishing. Before, the lyrics were parodies such as "Mean Mr. Mustaine".

Its title is a reference to the Beatles' album Abbey Road and Metallica's album Load. Abbey Road also provides the cover parody (referencing the image of the Beatles crossing Abbey Road in various ways, such as "Kliff McBurtney" wearing bear slippers, and a van with the plate "28KLIFF"), and most of the track list, with opener "Come Together" and the 16-minute medley on the album's Side B. Among the exclusions were "I Want You (She's So Heavy)" – which Beatallica had already spoofed as "Ktulu (He's So Heavy)" – and the George Harrison compositions "Here Comes the Sun" and "Something", denied the inclusion by his estate.

== Track listing ==
All lyrics are written by Lennon-McCartney.

No.	Title	Length
1.	"Come Together" (Incorporates the music of "Through the Never")	5:04
2.	"I Saw Her Standing There"	2:50
3.	"Michelle" (Incorporates the music of "For Whom the Bell Tolls")	4:48
4.	"Help!" (Incorporates the music of "Helpless")	3:26
5.	"Please Please Me" (Incorporates the music of "2 X 4")	2:44
6.	"Blackbird" (Incorporates the music of "Fade to Black")	2:04
7.	"You Never Give Me Your Money" (Incorporates the music of "My Friend of Misery")	3:21
8.	"Sun King" (Incorporates the music of "King Nothing")	1:42
9.	"Mean Mr. Mustard" (Incorporates the music of "The Four Horsemen")	1:34
10.	"Polythene Pam" (Incorporates the music of "My Apocalypse")	1:29
11.	"She Came In Through the Bathroom Window" (Incorporates the music of "Dirty Window")	1:32
12.	"Golden Slumbers" (Incorporates the music of "Until It Sleeps")	1:45
13.	"Carry That Weight" (Incorporates the music of "Whiplash")	2:14
14.	"The End" (Incorporates the music of "The End of the Line")	2:11
15.	"Her Majesty" (Incorporates the music of "The View")	1:20

== Credits ==
- Jaymz Lennfield - vocals, lyrics, songwriting, rhythm guitar
- Grg Hammetson - lead guitar, backing vocals, synthesizer
- Kliff McBurtney - bass, backing vocals, acoustic guitar on "Blackbird"
- Ringo Larz - drums, "Lou Reed" vocals in "Her Majesty"
- Dave Newkid - bass, backing vocals on "The End"
- Flemball Rasmartin - background vocals in "Carry That Weight"
- Diablo Mysterioso - guitar in "Please Please Me", "Mean Mr. Mustard" and "The End"
- Marshall (Sean Williamson) - guitar in "The End", background vocals in "Carry That Weight"
