= Sexton Blake (band) =

American rock band

- Origin: Portland, Oregon, U.S.
- Genres: Alternative rock, indie rock, indie pop
- Years active: 2004–present
- Label: Expunged Records
- Members: Josh Hodges; Ryan Biornstad; Tom Homolya; Tim Edgar

Sexton Blake is a rock band based in Portland, Oregon. They are signed to the independent record label, Expunged Records and their name derives from the British television series Sexton Blake.

== History ==
Its members include frontman Josh Hodges, Ryan Biornstad, Tom Homolya, and Tim Edgar. Hodges, along with Biornstad, are also members of Portland-based band Starfucker (also known as STRFKR). Biornstad left Starfucker in 2011.

Sexton Blake's debut eponymous album was recorded in New York City and released in 2004 as a solo project by Hodges, who then moved to Portland and started the band by the same name.

In 2006, Sexton Blake were featured on the album To Elliott, from Portland, a tribute album to Portland singer-songwriter Elliott Smith, performing a cover of "Rose Parade". The Washington Post described the band's performance as "faithful to the original's fragile aesthetic, if not [the] exact sound."

Sexton Blake's second album, Plays the Hits!, was released in July 2007. The album consists entirely of cover songs from the 1980s, an idea that was first proposed to Hodges by Expunged Records founder Anthony Davis.

== Members ==
- Josh Hodges – vocals, guitar
- Ryan Biornstad – keyboards
- Tom Homolya – bass
- Tim Edgar – drums

== Discography ==
=== Sexton Blake ===
2004 album that is sometimes titled Explosive Motion Picture Score or Josh Hodges' Sexton Blake. Includes the songs:

1. "Intro"
2. "Emma"
3. "Little Bit More"
4. "Jake - Keep It Together"
5. "Me or Mine"
6. "Want to Die"
7. "Alright"
8. "East of..."
9. "Quick"
10. "Doesnt Matter"
11. "Know the Way"
12. "Dreaming of Babylon"
13. "Abe"
14. "Better off Dead"

=== To: Elliott, From: Portland ===
2006 tribute album to Elliott Smith that includes Blake's version of Smith's "Rose Parade".

=== Plays the Hits! ===
2007 album that includes the cover versions of:

1. "Hungry Heart" by Bruce Springsteen
2. "Bette Davis Eyes" by Kim Carnes
3. "Young Turks" by Rod Stewart
4. "Making Love Out of Nothing at All" by Air Supply
5. "I Need Love" by LL Cool J
6. "The Logical Song" by Supertramp
7. "Oh L'amour" by Erasure
8. "Girl You Know It's True" by Milli Vanilli
9. "Rush Rush" by Paula Abdul
10. "Daniel" by Elton John
11. "Evil Woman" by Electric Light Orchestra
12. "Life in a Northern Town" by The Dream Academy
13. "Human Nature" by Michael Jackson

== Live performances ==
Sexton Blake has been on numerous tours of the Northwestern United States, and performed at the annual Portland festival PDX POP NOW! 2006, a free music festival showcasing local bands.
