= Masterful Mystery Tour =

Studio album by Beatallica
- Released: August 4, 2009
- Genre: Comedy rock, thrash metal
- Label: Oglio Records

Beatallica chronology
All You Need is Blood (2008)	Masterful Mystery Tour (2009)	Winter Plunderband (2009)

Professional ratings
Review scores
Source	Rating
Allmusic	4/5 stars
Blabbermouth	7/10 stars

Masterful Mystery Tour is the second album from Beatallica. It contains 12 tracks, which are mashups (or Bashups) of songs by the Beatles and Metallica. As with their first album Sgt. Hetfield's Motorbreath Pub Band, this album contains re-recordings of songs from the band's EP releases A Garage Dayz Nite and Beatallica, plus six new Beatles/Metallica mashup songs. The album cover is a parody of The Beatles' Magical Mystery Tour and Metallica's Master of Puppets.

Beatallica released a video for the single "Hero of the Day Tripper" on YouTube, the band's first official full-length video.

With a slight nod to Metallica's 2 of One video release, the official video for "Fuel on the Hill" was released on March 5, 2009, along with another version entitled "Benzin auf dem Berg". Both were shot at the same time and planned as a dual release. "Benzin auf dem Berg" is the German film noir counterpart to "Fuel on the Hill".

== Track listing ==
1. "The Battery of Jaymz and Yoko" - 4:32
2. "Masterful Mystery Tour" - 3:27
3. "Fuel on the Hill" - 3:54
4. "And I'm Evil?" - (2:43)
5. "Everybody's Got a Ticket to Ride Except for Me and My Lightning" - 4:46
6. "Running for Your Life" - 3:33
7. "The Thing That Should Not Let It Be" - 5:04
8. "Hero of the Day Tripper" - 3:22
9. "Got to Get You Trapped Under Ice" - 2:36
10. "I'll Just Bleed Your Face" - 3:12
11. "I Want to Choke Your Band" - 2:06
12. "Tomorrow Never Comes" - 3:55

== Production ==
- Special guest guitars by Diablo Mysterioso on "Fuel", "Masterful", "Running" and "Bleed"
- Gang vocals by the Masterful Mystery Minstrels: Jaymz, Ringo, Kliff, Grg III, Flemball and Emilie
- Recorded and engineered by Flemming Rasmartin, August 2008 - February 2009 at Bobby Peru's Shisha Bar, Milwaukee, WI
- Mixed and produced by Flemming and Beatallica
- Executive Producer: Carl Caprioglio
- Mastered by Alan Douches, April 2009 at West West Side, New Windsor, NY

== International releases ==
On September 9, 2009, the album was released in Japan with two bonus tracks: live versions of "I Want to Choke Your Band" and "Revol-ooh-tion" from a concert in Milwaukee, WI.

On September 11, 2009, Masterful Mystery Tour was released by the German label Megapress. The CD contains a bonus track, Beatallica's cover of the J.B.O. song "Ein Guter Tag Zum Sterben" (English translation: "A Good Day To Die"). Also of note is fact that Beatallica recorded this cover song singing the German lyrics, making this the second song they have released singing in German. Beatallica's cover version of this song was also included on the JBO 2009 album I Don't Like Metal - I Love It (Limited Edition version that includes a bonus CD).

== Official music videos from album ==
- Beatallica Hero of the Day Tripper (2009) on YouTube
- Beatallica Fuel on the Hill (2009) on YouTube
- Beatallica Benzin auf dem Berg (2009) on YouTube
