= JamGrass =

JamGrass: Progressive Bluegrass Jams on a Band Called Phish

Studio album by Various Artists (Phish Tribute)
- Released: March 23, 2004
- Recorded: December 2003, Mountainside Audio Labs, Nashville, Tennessee.
- Genre: Various
- Label: Compendia Records
- Producer: Travis Stinson

Various Artists (Phish Tribute) chronology
Still Phishin: A Bluegrass Tribute to Phish 2 (2002)	JamGrass: Progressive Bluegrass Jams on a Band Called Phish (2004)	The String Quartet Tribute To Phish (2004)

JamGrass: Progressive Bluegrass Jams on a Band Called Phish is a country and progressive bluegrass tribute album to the rock band Phish performed by a number of veteran Nashville session musicians, and released on March 23, 2004. The album's lead vocalist is Travis Stinson, who has performed on a number of occasions with The String Cheese Incident. The album mainly features material from the latter part of Phish's career.

== Track listing ==
1. Birds Of A Feather - 4:41
2. Bouncing Around The Room - 4:08
3. Sample In A Jar - 4:00
4. Chalk Dust Torture - 4:38
5. Farmhouse - 3:37
6. Fast Enough For You - 3:45
7. Down With Disease - 4:04
8. Heavy Things - 3:25
9. 46 Days - 4:37
10. Free - 3:17
11. Gotta Jibboo - 4:59
12. Back On The Train - 3:40

== Personnel ==
Scott Simontacchi: vocals, mandolin

Travis Stinson: vocals

Johnny Hiland: guitar

Mark Fain: bass

Bryan Landers: banjo

Andy Leftwich: fiddle

Bob Mater: drums

Wright Pinson: percussion
