= Casey Jones (Grateful Dead song) =

Grateful Dead song

Song by Grateful Dead

from the album Workingman's Dead
- Released: June 14, 1970
- Studio: Pacific High (San Francisco)
- Genre: Blues rock; country rock; Americana
- Length: 4:24
- Label: Warner Bros.
- Composer: Jerry Garcia
- Lyricist: Robert Hunter
- Producers: Bob Matthews; Betty Cantor; Grateful Dead

"Casey Jones" is a song by the American rock band the Grateful Dead.

== Theme ==
"Casey Jones" is about a railroad engineer who is on the verge of a train wreck due to his train going too fast, a sleeping switch man, and another train being on the same track and headed for him. Jones is described as being "high on cocaine" (the song even makes a double entendre of advising Jones to "watch his speed"). It was inspired by the story of an actual engineer named Casey Jones. The engineer's exploits were also sung of in an earlier folk song called "The Ballad of Casey Jones", which the Grateful Dead played live several times.

The Grateful Dead's song bears no resemblance whatsoever to the actual train wreck.

== Conception ==
The music was written by Jerry Garcia, and the lyrics are by Robert Hunter. Hunter stated in a 2015 interview with Rolling Stone that "'Casey Jones' didn't start out as a song, it just suddenly popped into my mind: 'Driving that train, high on cocaine, Casey Jones, you better watch your speed.' I just wrote that down and I went on to whatever else I was doing, and some time later I came across it and thought, 'That's the germ of a pretty good song.'"

== Release, live performances, and airplay ==
The song first appeared on the Dead's 1970 album Workingman's Dead. Subsequently, it was included on a number of their live albums.

The Grateful Dead played "Casey Jones" in concert on a regular basis from June 1969 through October 1974. After that, they continued playing it live, but less often. In total they performed the song in concert more than 300 times.

The song was released as a downloadable track for the game Rock Band on March 4, 2008.

"Casey Jones" has received significant airplay on progressive rock, album-oriented rock, and classic rock radio stations over the years, and so is one of the Dead's songs that is more recognizable by non-Deadheads.

== Interpretations ==
The song was interpreted by artist Nina Paley in the 1990s comic book Grateful Dead Comix.

== Cover versions ==
- As of 2024, "Casey Jones" has been performed live by Dead & Company 60 times.
- "Casey Jones" is performed by Warren Zevon and David Lindley on Deadicated: A Tribute to the Grateful Dead, a 1991 album by various artists.
- The song is included in Pickin' on the Grateful Dead: A Tribute, a bluegrass album of Grateful Dead songs.
- Another bluegrass version of the song appears on the 2008 album Rex (Live at the Fillmore) by Keller Williams, Keith Moseley and Jeff Austin.
- A version by the Wailing Souls is included on Volume 1 of the reggae Grateful Dead tribute album Fire on the Mountain.
