= A Garage Dayz Nite =

EP by Beatallica
- Released: 2001
- Genre: Comedy rock
- Length: 19:17
- Label: None

Beatallica chronology
A Garage Dayz Nite (2001)	Beatallica (2004)

A Garage Dayz Nite is the debut EP from Beatallica. It contains seven tracks, made from combinations of Beatles and Metallica songs. The cover is a parody of The Beatles' second UK album, With the Beatles, while the crude handwriting is a reference to that used in Metallica's The $5.98 E.P. – Garage Days Re-Revisited.

"Sgt. Hetfield's Motorbreath Pub Band", "A Garage Dayz Nite", "For Horsemen" and "...And Justice for All My Loving" were re-recorded for the band's first full-length album, Sgt. Hetfield's Motorbreath Pub Band. "The Thing That Should Not Let It Be" and "Everybody's Got a Ticket to Ride Except for Me and My Lightning" were re-recorded for their second album, Masterful Mystery Tour.

== Track listing ==
1. "Sgt. Hetfield's Motorbreath Pub Band"
  - Lyrical References:
    - Motörhead
2. "A Garage Dayz Nite"
  - Lyrical References:
    - "Wherever I May Roam"
    - "Trapped Under Ice"
    - "Love at First Sting"
3. "For Horsemen"
  - Lyrical References:
    - "King Nothing"
    - Winger
4. "No Remorseful Reply"
  - Lyrical References:
    - "Creeping Death"
5. "The Thing That Should Not Let It Be"
  - Musical References:
    - "One"
    - "Fade to Black"
6. "Everybody's Got a Ticket to Ride Except for Me and My Lightning"
7. "...And Justice for All My Loving"
  - Lyrical References:
    - "Sad but True"
  - Musical References:
    - "Helpless"
