= Sgt. Hetfield's Motorbreath Pub Band =

Studio album by Beatallica
- Released: July 10, 2007
- Genre: Comedy metal, thrash metal
- Label: Oglio Records

Beatallica chronology
Beatallica (2004)	Sgt. Hetfield's Motorbreath Pub Band (2007)	All You Need is Blood (2008)

Professional ratings
Review scores
Source	Rating
Allmusic	3.5/5 stars
PiercingMetal	3.5/5 stars

Sgt. Hetfield's Motorbreath Pub Band is the first published album from Beatallica. It contains 13 tracks, made from combinations of the Beatles and Metallica songs and was released on Tuesday July 10, 2007. Majority of the tracks are re-recordings of songs from the band's EP releases A Garage Dayz Nite and Beatallica.

== Track listing ==
1. "Sgt. Hetfield's Motorbreath Pub Band" – 2:22
2. "Revol-ooh-tion" – 3:35
3. "Blackened the U.S.S.R." – 2:28
4. "Sandman" – 4:48
5. "Helvester of Skelter" – 5:28
6. "A Garage Dayz Nite" – 2:05
7. "Anesthesia (I'm Only Sleeping)" – 2:21
8. "Leper Madonna" – 2:01
9. "Ktulu (He's So Heavy)" – 7:43
10. "For Horsemen" – 2:47
11. "Hey Dude" – 7:25
12. "Sgt. Hetfield's Motorbreath Pub Band (reprise)" – 2:02
13. "...And Justice for All My Loving" – 1:52

== Production ==
- Recorded and engineered by Flemball Rasmartin, November 2006 - January 2007 at Bobby Peru's Scabby Road Studios, Milwaukee, Wisconsin
- Mixed and produced by Flemball, Jaymz, and Ringo, January - February 2007
- Mastered by Alan Douches, February 2007 at West West Side, New Windsor, NY
- Art design by Jason Briesch
- Art concepts developed by Beatallica and Jason Briesch
- Pics by KuMays
- Gang vocals by the Motor Breath Pub Hooligans: Jaymz, GRG, Kliff, VVeber, MurphDawg, Emillie & Beer by Jo Jo

== International releases ==
- Sgt. Hetfield's Motorbreath Pub Band was released in Poland during 2008 on the label Metal Mind Productions (without bonus tracks).
- September 10, 2008 saw the release of the Japanese import version of the Sgt. Hetfield's album which includes three bonus live tracks recorded from a show in Hannover, Germany (bonus tracks: "Sgt. Hetfield's Motorbreath Pub Band", "A Garage Dayz Nite" and "...And Justice For All My Loving").
