= Sharin' in the Groove =

Studio album by Various Artists (Phish Tribute)
- Released: July 24, 2001
- Genre: Various
- Label: Mockingbird Foundation

Various Artists (Phish Tribute) chronology
Gone Phishin (2000)	Sharin' in the Groove (2001)	Still Phishin: A Bluegrass Tribute to Phish 2 (2002)

Professional ratings
Review scores
Source	Rating
Allmusic	link

Sharin' in the Groove: Celebrating the Music of Phish is an all-star charity Phish tribute album released on July 24, 2001. It features 23 acts covering 20 Phish songs, all on a volunteer basis, to fund music education for children under the auspices of the Mockingbird Foundation. Over 25,000 copies were sold in the first two weeks, making it one of the fastest selling tribute albums ever.

Executive Producer Ellis Godard selected artists to be as diverse as possible in style, genre, and instrumentation, and arranged the tracks to resemble a Phish concert, with the more exploratory material in the second "set" (disc two). Also, in a twist on typical tribute albums, each artist represents an influence on Phish (such as a style they've mimicked, or an artist they've covered), whereas most tributes feature artists influenced by the band they are covering.

In addition to the album, a series of bonus tracks was released exclusively online.

== Track listing ==
=== Disc one ===
1. "Bouncing Around the Room" – Arlo Guthrie and Xavier – 4:37
2. "Gumbo" – Jimmy Buffett – 4:25
3. "Runaway Jim" – Gordon Stone Trio – 4:35
4. "The Wedge" – Amfibian – 8:31
5. "Alumni Blues" – Hot Tuna – 4:57
6. "Waste" – Dave Matthews – 3:38
7. "Suzy Greenberg" – Son Seals and Rebecca's Statue – 6:42
8. "Sample in a Jar" – Little Feat – 4:52
9. "My Friend My Friend / Guyute" – Vermont Youth Orchestra – 12:10

=== Disc two ===
1. "Makisupa Policeman" – The Wailers and K.Kay – 4:49
2. "Sand" – Tom Tom Club – 4:51
3. "Tweezer / Magilla" – Michael Ray and the Cosmic Krewe – 2:59
4. "Julius" – Merl Saunders and Funky Friends – 4:02
5. "Cars Trucks Buses" – Project Logic with John Scofield – 4:54
6. "Axilla (Part II)" – Preston School of Industry – 3:22
7. "Chalkdust Torture" – Los Villains – 7:02
8. "Free (End of Session version)" – Boredoms – 7:26
9. "Faht > Catapult > Tweezer Reprise" – Lake Trout – 8:45
10. "Poor Heart" – FRED – 2:10
11. "Golgi Apparatus" – Stanford Marching Band – 3:57

=== Bonus disc ===
1. "Cars Trucks Buses" (live) – Duke Ellington Orchestra – 4:09
2. "Wolfman's Brother" (live) – Phil Lesh and Friends with Donna Jean Godchaux – 13:50
3. "Wading in the Velvet Sea" – Jackson Sneed – 4:28
4. "Halley's Comet" – Whoolicious! – 5:14
5. "The Wedge" (live) – The String Cheese Incident – 5:56
6. "Wilson" – Orobourus – 5:07
7. "The Moma Dance" – Ten Ton Chicken – 4:28
8. "Possum" – The Big Wu – 10:08
9. "Cars Trucks Buses" (live) – DJ Logic and Michael Kang – 5:30

==== Notes ====
- Xavier features Arlo Guthrie's son Abe Guthrie
- Amfibian features Phish lyricist Tom Marshall.
- Hot Tuna is half of Jefferson Airplane.
- Dave Matthews' track is his first solo studio release
- Little Feat's cover of "Sample in a Jar" also appears on their 2000 studio album Chinese Work Songs.
- The Wailers' track is their first studio release in a decade, and with the original producer from their days as backing band for Bob Marley.
- Tom Tom Club is half of Talking Heads.
- Preston School of Industry includes Scott Kannberg of Pavement
- Los Villains includes David Hidalgo and Louie Perez of Los Lobos, as well as each of their sons.
- FRED are the International Champion Barbershop Quartet.
