= Pickin' on the Grateful Dead: A Tribute =

Studio album
- Released: 1997
- Recorded: Studio "Z", Santa Barbara, California
- Genre: Bluegrass
- Length: 63:54
- Label: CMH Records, Inc.
- Producer: David West

Alternative cover
- CD cover of the 2001 reissue

Professional ratings
Review scores
Source	Rating
Allmusic	3/5 stars

Pickin' on the Grateful Dead: A Tribute is a 1997 tribute album to the Grateful Dead consisting of thirteen of their songs replayed in a bluegrass style. It is a part of the Pickin' On… series.

== Track listing ==
1. "Althea" (Robert Hunter/Jerry Garcia) - 5:31
2. "Scarlet Begonias" (Hunter/Garcia) - 5:24
3. "Friend of the Devil" (Hunter/Garcia/Dawson) - 4:25
4. "Bird Song" (Hunter/Garcia) - 6:32
5. "Truckin'" (Hunter/Garcia/Phil Lesh/Bob Weir) - 6:06
6. "Lady with a Fan" (Hunter/Garcia) - 4:12
7. "Casey Jones" (Hunter/Garcia) - 4:12
8. "Samson and Delilah" (arrangement: David West) - 3:46
9. "Touch of Grey" (Hunter/Garcia) - 6:02
10. "Cumberland Blues" (Hunter/Garcia/Lesh) - 5:26
11. "Ripple" (Hunter/Garcia) - 4:10
12. "Goin' Down the Road Feelin' Bad" (arrangement: David West) - 3:59
13. "Dark Star" (Hunter/Garcia) - 4:18

== Personnel ==
- David West – Guitars, mandolin, banjo, bass, dobro, hammered dulcimer, percussion, background vocals
- Mike Mullins – Guitar, Mandolin
- Phil Salazar – Fiddles
- John Rosenburg – Piano
- Tom Ball – Harmonica
- Jody Eulitz – Drums
- Bill Flores – Pedal steel guitar
- Barney Tower – Electric guitar
- Pat Milliken – Guitars, mandolin
- Bo Fox – Percussion
- Kenny Sultan – Guitar
- Paul Lee – Fiddle
- David West – Producer, Engineer
- Recorded at – Studio "Z", Santa Barbara, California
