= Scott D. Davis =

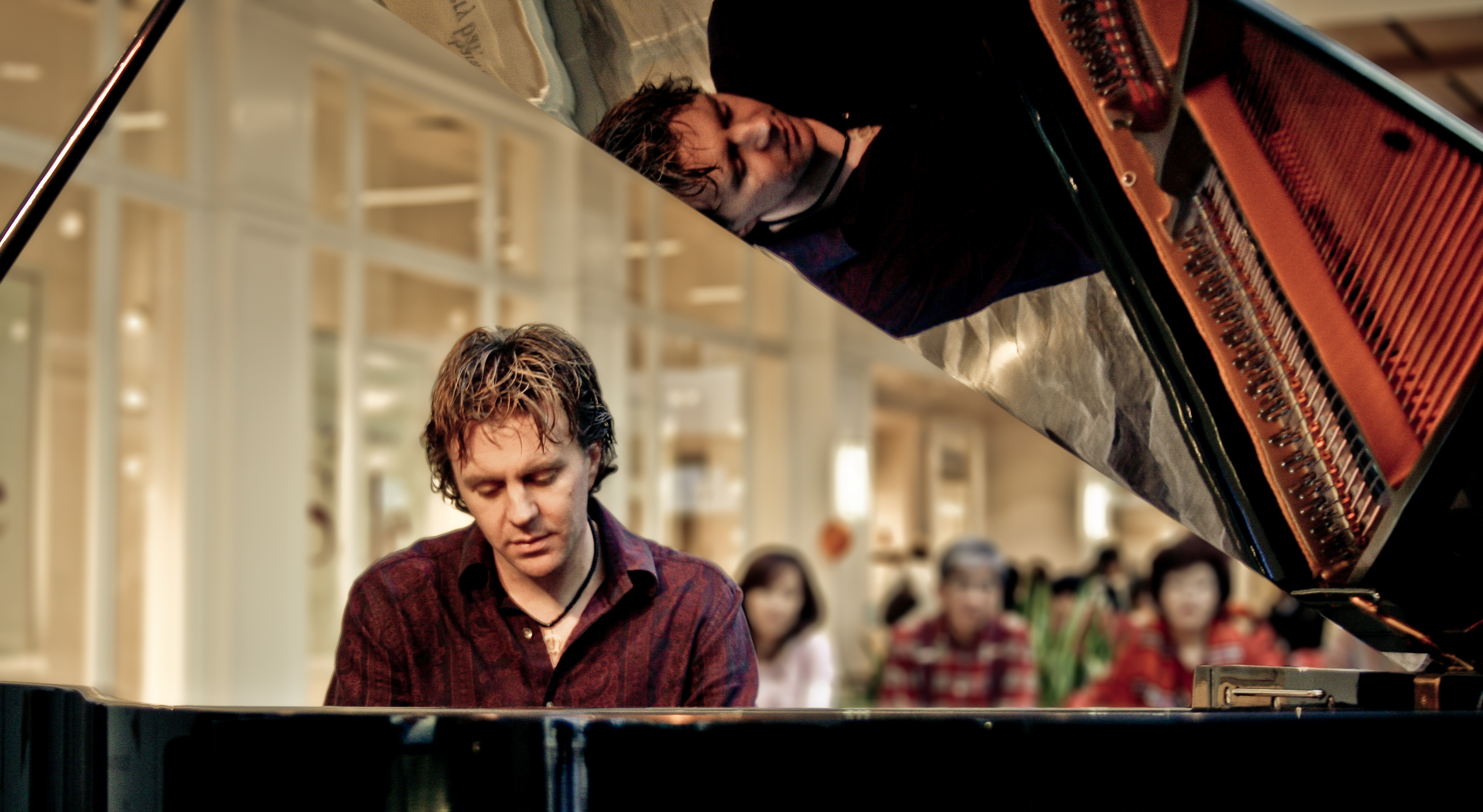

Background information
- Born: 26 April 1973 (age 52); Wiesbaden, Germany
- Genres: New age, rock
- Instrument: Piano
- Years active: 2001–present
- Website: inspiringppiano.com

Scott D. Davis is a new age pianist from Dixon, California. He has released five albums. He considers his style to be similar to pianists David Lanz, George Winston, Yanni, and Michael Nyman.

== Music ==
Davis' music is featured on Whisperings: Solo Piano Radio, an internet based broadcast that draws over 500,000 listeners each month. Two of his tracks have also been chosen to be included on Pure Touch Volume 2, part of a nationally released series of sampler CDs. New Age Reporter described him by saying "his exuberance and originality are invigorating and his upbeat attitude contagious" while David Lanz has called his music "heavy mellow." Davis is a Metallica fan and has published an album, Pianotarium, of Metallica covers.

== Discography ==
- Piano & Woodwinds (2001)
- Tahoma (2003)
- Winter Journey (2004)
- Rockfluence (2006)
- Pianotarium: Piano Tribute to Metallica (2007)
