= To Elliott, from Portland =

To: Elliott, From: Portland

Compilation album by Various Artists
- Released: February 7, 2006
- Label: Expunged Records

Various Artists chronology
Remote Memory: A Tribute to Elliott Smith (2006)	To: Elliott, From: Portland (2006)	Home to Oblivion: An Elliott Smith Tribute (2006)

To: Elliott, from: Portland is a 2006 tribute album to Elliott Smith that contains musicians from Portland, Oregon. The Thermals' version of "Ballad of Big Nothing" was recorded and mixed by Smith's ex-girlfriend Joanna Bolme. Many of the artists knew Smith personally and played with Smith at various times.

== Track listing ==
All tracks are written by Elliott Smith.

No.	Title	Artist	Length
1.	"Clementine"	The Decemberists	4:25
2.	"Satellite"	The Helio Sequence	3:17
3.	"The Biggest Lie"	Dolorean	3:16
4.	"Ballad of Big Nothing"	The Thermals	2:43
5.	"I Didn't Understand"	Swords	2:35
6.	"Rose Parade"	Sexton Blake	4:21
7.	"Between the Bars"	Amelia	2:41
8.	"Needle in the Hay"	Eric Matthews	4:34
9.	"Division Day"	We Are Telephone	3:18
10.	"Angeles"	Crosstide	2:31
11.	"Wouldn't Mama Be Proud"	Jeff Trott	4:01
12.	"Speed Trials"	Knock-Knock	4:12
13.	"King's Crossing"	To Live and Die in L.A.	3:05
14.	"Happiness"	Lifesavas	3:57
15.	"High Times"	Sean Croghan	4:17
