= Home to Oblivion: An Elliott Smith Tribute =

Home to Oblivion: Elliott Smith Tribute

Studio album by Christopher O'Riley
- Released: April 11, 2006
- Label: World Village USA

Christopher O'Riley chronology
To Elliott, From Portland (2006)	Home to Oblivion: Elliott Smith Tribute (2006)	Coming Up Roses: Sacramento Remembers Elliott Smith (2007)

Home to Oblivion: An Elliott Smith Tribute is a 2006 instrumental tribute album to Elliott Smith by pianist Christopher O'Riley. The album received mixed reviews from critics.

== Track listing ==
No.	Title	Length
1.	"Coast to Coast"	5:39
2.	"Let's Get Lost"	2:41
3.	"I Didn't Understand"	2:49
4.	"Speed Trials"	4:09
5.	"I Better Be Quiet Now"	3:44
6.	"Roman Candle"	4:20
7.	"Satellite"	3:09
8.	"Independence Day"	3:16
9.	"Cupid's Trick"	3:30
10.	"Oh Well, Okay"	3:06
11.	"No Life"	4:38
12.	"Between the Bars"	2:44
13.	"Christian Brothers"	5:48
14.	"Everything Means Nothing to Me"	2:59
15.	"Waltz #1"	4:26
16.	"Half Right"	4:26
17.	"Stupidity Tries"	3:18
18.	"Bye"	1:43
