= Still Phishin =

Still Phishin': A Bluegrass Tribute to Phish 2

Studio album by Various Artists (Phish Tribute)
- Released: April 9, 2002
- Genre: Various
- Label: CMH Records
- Producer: Rollin' in the Hay, Randy Hunter, David West, Dennis Caplinger

Various Artists (Phish Tribute) chronology
Sharin' in the Groove (2001)	Still Phishin': A Bluegrass Tribute to Phish 2 (2002)	JamGrass (2004)

Still Phishin': A Bluegrass Tribute to Phish 2 is a bluegrass tribute album to the rock band Phish led by Alabama-based bluegrass collective Rollin' In The Hay. The songs' arrangements were constructed by bandleader Rick Carter. Unlike the previous Phish bluegrass tribute album Gone Phishin, this album features a number of rare songs, some of which (such as "Mike's Song") were never released on a Phish studio album.

Both volumes are available in a double disc set titled Forever Phishin': The Bluegrass Tribute to Phish.

== Track listing ==
1. Mike's Song - 2:24
2. First Tube - 6:43
3. You Enjoy Myself - 6:01
4. Julius - 3:15
5. Maze - 8:05
6. Farmhouse - 3:38
7. Weekapaug Groove - 6:29
8. All Things Reconsidered - 3:57
9. Down With Disease - 4:25
10. Waste - 3:31

== Personnel ==
Barry Waldrep: guitar, banjo, dobro, mandolin

Dennis Caplinger: guitar, banjo, mandolin, fiddle, bass

David West: guitar, banjo, mandolin, bass

Rick Carter: guitar, percussion

Gabe Witcher: fiddle

Tom Ball: harmonica

Stan Foster: bass

Randy Hunter: percussion

Lorenzo Martinez: percussion
