= Overboard (a cappella) =

American a cappella group

- Origin: Boston, Massachusetts, USA
- Genres: a cappella
- Instrument: Voices
- Years active: 2006–present
- Members: Caleb Whelden; Johanna Vinson; Sam Fischer; Eric Morrissey; Tracy Robertson
- Website: overboardvocals.com

Overboard is an a cappella group based in Boston, Massachusetts.

== History ==
Founded by Nicholas Girard in the spring of 2006, Overboard was first conceived as a street performance group intent on entertaining audiences around coastal New England during the summer months. The group's first album, Shipwrecked, was released during that summer and was distributed during the group's frequent busking stops in Newburyport, Massachusetts, Freeport, Maine and Burlington, Vermont, as well as around their hometown of Boston. On the heels of their successful first summer, the group decided to continue performing together on a more permanent basis.

In February 2007, Overboard began recording its second album, Stranded, which was released that May. To promote the album, the group performed at a variety of venues throughout New England starting with their appearance at Eggstock, an annual environmental awareness festival held at Flamig Farm in Simsbury, Connecticut where they sang the Beatles' "Here Comes the Sun" to commemorate the unveiling of the state's first commercial Solar Photovoltaic System. Then, in July, the group performed for audiences at Middlesex School Summer Arts Camp in Concord, Massachusetts and at Idol Camp, organized by the producers of American Idol and held on one of the campuses of the Northfield Mount Hermon School in Northfield, Massachusetts. On December 14, 2007, the group was selected as a top five finalist in the CBS Early Show A Cappella Quest competition hosted by Boyz II Men.

At the 2008 Boston regional Harmony Sweepstakes A Cappella Festival held at Tufts University, Overboard placed third. That spring, the group followed up their Harmony Sweepstakes participation with performances for a series of charitable organizations, including concerts for the Avon foundation Breast Cancer Crusade, the American Cancer Society Relay for Life and the opening ceremonies of Special Olympics of Massachusetts Summer Games.

Overboard's third album, Castaways, a compilation of oldies and a cappella standards, was released in September 2008. Their fourth album, Tidings, a collection of holiday songs, was released in November 2008. Tidings received a Contemporary A Cappella Recording Award (CARA) nomination for Best Holiday Album and won a CARA for Best Holiday Song ("We Three Kings"). In 2009, the track was chosen for CASC: Christmas A Cappella Volume 1, an international holiday compilation album co-released by CASA and A Cappella Records.

Begun in the spring of 2009, Overboard's fifth album, Help!, was inspired by the release of the newly remastered Beatles repertoire and Harmonix's The Beatles Rock Band music video game. Help! was envisioned as a rock opera/concept album, in a similar vein to The Who's Tommy and Pink Floyd's The Wall. Through original arrangements, Overboard reinterpreted pieces of over forty Beatles songs and sounds in order to provide a soundtrack to the imagined backdrop of a tempestuous love affair between Billy Shears and Eleanor Rigby.

Overboard released Help! in November 2009. Inspired by the success of Radiohead's digital release of In Rainbows, Overboard distributed free digital downloads of the entirety of Help! on their website for a limited time. In February 2010, Help! was nominated for CARAs for Best Pop/Rock Album and Best Pop/Rock Song ("Hello Goodbye"). CASA's A Cappella Community Awards (ACAs) recognized Overboard again in 2010 with 8 nominations, as voted by a cappella experts and fans. For the 2010 ACAs, "Help!" was recognized as runner-up for Best Album and group founder, Nick Girard, tied as runner-up for Best Male Vocalist.

In September 2010, Overboard began a year-long project entitled "Free Track Tuesday." Every Tuesday on the group's website, a new track, arranged, recorded and produced entirely by Overboard members, is released as a free digital download. The project was inspired in part by Starbucks' Free Music Tuesday program. Three tracks from the first quarter of Free Track Tuesday garnered one 2011 CARA award, for the traditional spiritual "Amazing Grace," and two runners-up awards, for "Toxic" (originally performed by Britney Spears) and "Used To Love U" (originally performed by John Legend).

In recognition of their performances, recordings and production work, Overboard received 10 2011 ACA nominations, including Favorite Pop/Rock Group, Favorite Mashup (25 or 6 to 4/Babe I'm Gonna Leave You) and Favorite A Cappella Song That Doesn't Sound A Cappella (Hedwig's Theme from Harry Potter). Individual achievement nominations were also given to Alfredo Austin (Favorite Rap Performance), Scott Cobban (Favorite Vocal Percussionist) and Nick Girard (Favorite Male Vocalist, Favorite Arranger, Favorite A Cappella Producer).

== Recent and upcoming events ==
Following the 2011 Tōhoku earthquake and tsunami in Japan, Overboard launched a project called HOPE to raise money for the American Red Cross' relief efforts. In exchange for donating, contributors are given access to successive tiers of rewards, including a digital download of the group's special release album Hope. 100% of the proceeds from HOPE are donated the Red Cross' earthquake and tsunami relief efforts.

On April 17, 2011, Overboard won 1st Place at the Boston Regional Harmony Sweepstakes Festival. In addition to winning the overall competition, the group also won Audience Favorite and Best Arrangement (for All For Love). Overboard competed at the Harmony Sweepstakes Festival's National Finals on May 14, 2011.

== Overboard Productions ==
Through the Free Track Tuesday program, group members have become more involved in the recording side of a cappella and now do freelance production work for collegiate a cappella and professional a cappella groups. Clients include groups such as Yale University's The Whiffenpoofs and Mixed Company of Yale, as well as Brown University's The Brown Derbies. A recent Overboard Productions release, a cover of Katy Perry's hit song Firework performed by Ithaca College's Ithacappella and Premium Blend a cappella groups reached iTunes' Top 200. Proceeds of the song are donated to The Trevor Project, an organization focused on suicide prevention efforts among LGBTQ youth.

Overboard Productions edited and mixed the backing track to the University of St Andrews' The Other Guys' viral video Royal Romance. Released to commemorate the wedding of Prince William and Catherine Middleton, Royal Romance is a mashup of Lady Gaga's Bad Romance, Michael Jackson's Billie Jean and Gustav Holst's I Vow To Thee, My Country The video was released on April 12, 2011, and received over 100,000 views in the first week. Clips of the video were also featured on The Today Show.

== Awards ==
| Year | Presenter | Award | Result |
|---|---|---|---|
| 2007 | CBS Early Show & Boyz II Men | A Cappella Quest Competition | Top 5 Finalists |
| 2008 | Harmony Sweepstakes A Cappella Festival | Boston Regional Winner | 3rd Place |
| 2009 | Contemporary A Cappella Recording Awards of CASA | Best Holiday Album | Nominated, "Tidings" |
| 2009 | Contemporary A Cappella Recording Awards of CASA | Best Holiday Song | Won, "We Three Kings" |
| 2010 | Contemporary A Cappella Recording Awards of CASA | Best Pop/Rock Album | Nominated, "Help!" |
| 2010 | Contemporary A Cappella Recording Awards of CASA | Best Pop/Rock Song | Nominated, "Hello Goodbye" |
| 2010 | Harmony Sweepstakes A Cappella Festival | Boston Regional Winner | 3rd Place |
| 2010 | A Cappella Community Awards | | |
| 2010 | A Cappella Community Awards | Favorite Professional Album | Runner-Up, "Help!" |
| 2010 | A Cappella Community Awards | Favorite Male Vocalist | Runner-Up, Nick Girard |
| 2010 | A Cappella Community Awards | Favorite Pop/Rock Group | Nominated |
| 2010 | A Cappella Community Awards | Favorite Vocal Percussionist | Nominated, Scott Cobban |
| 2010 | A Cappella Community Awards | Favorite Arranger | Nominated, Nick Girard |
| 2010 | A Cappella Community Awards | Favorite Medley | Nominated, "Good Night" (from "Help!") |
| 2010 | A Cappella Community Awards | Most Cutting Edge Group | Nominated |
| 2010 | A Cappella Community Awards | Favorite Arrangement | Nominated, "Hello Goodbye" (from "Help!") |
| 2011 | Contemporary A Cappella Recording Awards of CASA | Best Religious Song | Won, "Amazing Grace" |
| 2011 | Contemporary A Cappella Recording Awards of CASA | Best Jazz Song | Runner-Up, "Toxic" |
| 2011 | Contemporary A Cappella Recording Awards of CASA | Best R&B/Hip Hop Song | Runner-Up, "Used to Love U" |
| 2011 | Harmony Sweepstakes A Cappella Festival | Boston Regional Winner | 1st Place |
| 2011 | Harmony Sweepstakes A Cappella Festival | Audience Favorite | 1st Place |
| 2011 | Harmony Sweepstakes A Cappella Festival | Best Arrangement | 1st Place, "All for Love" |
| 2011 | A Cappella Community Awards | | |
| 2011 | A Cappella Community Awards | Favorite Pop/Rock Group | Nominated |
| 2011 | A Cappella Community Awards | Favorite Male Vocalist | Nominated, Nick Girard |
| 2011 | A Cappella Community Awards | Favorite Vocal Percussionist | Nominated, Scott Cobban |
| 2011 | A Cappella Community Awards | Favorite Rap Performance | Nominated, Alfredo Austin for "Baby" |
| 2011 | A Cappella Community Awards | Favorite Arranger | Nominated, Nick Girard |
| 2011 | A Cappella Community Awards | Favorite A Cappella Producer | Nominated, Nick Girard |
| 2011 | A Cappella Community Awards | Favorite Mashup | Runner-Up, "25 or 6 to 4/Babe I'm Gonna Leave You" |
| 2011 | A Cappella Community Awards | Favorite Gender Bender Solo | Runner-Up, "Toxic" |
| 2011 | A Cappella Community Awards | Favorite A Cappella Song That Doesn't Sound A Cappella | Won, "Hedwig's Theme" |
| 2011 | A Cappella Community Awards | Favorite Live Performance Moment | Nominated, Help! at the Las Vegas A Cappella Summit |
| 2012 | Contemporary A Cappella Recording Awards of CASA | Best Rap/Hip Hop Song | Runner Up, "How Low" |
| 2012 | Contemporary A Cappella Recording Awards of CASA | Best Folk/World Song | Nominated, "Hengilas" |
| 2012 | Contemporary A Cappella Recording Awards of CASA | Best Pop/Rock Song | Nominated, "Moves Like Jagger" |
| 2013 | Contemporary A Cappella Recording Awards of CASA | Best Hip Hop/R&B Song | Nominated, "All of the Lights" (produced by Plaid Productions) |

== Discography ==
- Shipwrecked (2006)
- Stranded (2007)
- Castaways (2008)
- Tidings (2008)
- Help! (2009)
- Free Track Tuesday (2010–2011)
- Hope (special release album, 2011)
