= Metallic Assault: A Tribute to Metallica =

Compilation album by various artists
- Released: 2000
- Genre: Heavy metal, thrash metal
- Label: Big Eye Music

Metallic Assault: A Tribute to Metallica is a tribute album to heavy metal band Metallica. It features Metallica covers played not by formal bands, but collaborations between musicians from several bands. Songs from Kill 'Em All (1983) all the way to Metallica (1991), with the exception of ...And Justice for All (1988), are featured. Robert Trujillo, who later joined Metallica, plays bass on Battery with Dave Lombardo.

== Track listing ==
Track	Title	Performers	Original Album	Length
1.	"Battery"	Mike Clark (Suicidal Tendencies; guitar); Eric Knudtsen (Flotsam and Jetsam; vocals); Dave Lombardo (Slayer; drums); Robert Trujillo (Suicidal Tendencies, Metallica; bass)	Master of Puppets	5:20
2.	"Sad but True"	Joey Belladonna (Anthrax; vocals); Bruce Kulick (KISS, Grand Funk Railroad; guitar); Marco Mendoza (John Sykes, Blue Murder; bass); Eric Singer (Kiss, Alice Cooper; drums)	Metallica	5:19
3.	"Welcome Home (Sanitarium)"	Whitfield Crane (Ugly Kid Joe; vocals); Mikkey Dee (Motörhead, King Diamond; drums); Scott Ian (Anthrax; rhythm guitar); Tony Levin (King Crimson; bass); John Marshall (Metal Church; lead guitar)	Master of Puppets	6:25
4.	"The Unforgiven"	Frankie Banali (Quiet Riot; drums); Tony Franklin (Roy Harper, The Firm; bass); Doug Pinnick (King's X; vocals); Vernon Reid (Living Colour; guitar)	Metallica	6:31
5.	"The Thing That Should Not Be"	Jason Bonham (Bonham; drums); John Garcia (Kyuss; vocals); Jeff Pilson (Dokken; bass); Kurdt Vanderhoof (Metal Church; guitar)	Master of Puppets	6:16
6.	"Enter Sandman"	Tommy Aldridge (Black Oak Arkansas, Ozzy Osbourne; drums); Burton C. Bell (Fear Factory; vocals); John Christ (Danzig; guitar); Robert Trujillo (bass)	Metallica	5:27
7.	"Whiplash"	Vinny Appice (Black Sabbath, Dio; drums); Scott Ian (guitar); Billy Milano (Method of Destruction; vocals); Phil Soussan (Johnny Hallyday, Ozzy Osbourne; bass)	Kill 'Em All	4:08
8.	"Nothing Else Matters"	Bob Balch (Fu Manchu; guitar); Gregg Bissonette (Steve Vai, David Lee Roth; drums); Lemmy Kilmister (Motörhead; bass); Jon Oliva (Savatage; vocals)	Metallica	6:20
9.	"Seek & Destroy"	Jimmy Bain (Rainbow, Dio; bass); Chuck Billy (Testament; vocals); Aynsley Dunbar (Frank Zappa, Journey; drums); Jake E. Lee (Ozzy Osbourne, Badlands; guitar)	Kill 'Em All	6:44
10.	"For Whom the Bell Tolls"	Eric Bloom (Blue Öyster Cult; vocals); Aynsley Dunbar (drums); Tony Franklin (bass); Al Pitrelli (Trans-Siberian Orchestra, Savatage, Megadeth; guitar)	Ride the Lightning	5:17

== See also ==
- Metallic Attack: The Ultimate Tribute
- Pianotarium: Piano Tribute to Metallica
