= Pianotarium =

Pianotarium: Piano Tribute to Metallica

Studio album by Scott D. Davis
- Released: 2007
- Genre: Instrumental
- Length: 60:44

Scott D. Davis chronology
Rockfluence (2005)	Pianotarium: Piano Tribute to Metallica (2007)

Pianotarium: Piano Tribute to Metallica is a piano tribute album to heavy metal band Metallica by Scott D. Davis. It contains eight piano covers of Metallica songs and three original compositions. Davis had been a Metallica fan since his teenage years; explaining the genesis of the album to the Sacramento News & Review, he said: "I’ve been a huge Metallica fan since I was 14, and have wanted to do this album for a long time. I had a hunch that their music could sound really amazing on the piano. There’s a great deal of beauty in Metallica’s music, and I wanted the piano arrangements to highlight that quality, to bring forth many of the harmonies and intricacies that have always set Metallica apart. I also tried to take advantage of the powerful, edgy resonance of the grand piano, so that it wouldn’t totally lose its 'metal' intensity."

== Track listing ==
1. "Enter Sandman" – 5:39
2. "Until It Sleeps" – 4:27
3. "Master of Puppets" – 8:44
4. "The Unforgiven" – 6:06
5. "Welcome Home (Sanitarium)" – 6:23
6. "Nothing Else Matters" – 6:02
7. "One" – 6:17
8. "Fade to Black" – 6:49
9. "The Renewal - I - Lament" – 2:28
10. "The Renewal - II - Inner Battle" – 3:50
11. "The Renewal - III - Return to Sanity" – 3:53

== See also ==
- Metallic Assault: A Tribute to Metallica
- Metallic Attack: The Ultimate Tribute
