= Metallic Attack: The Ultimate Tribute =

Compilation album by various artists
- Released: August 3, 2004
- Genre: Thrash metal, heavy metal
- Length: 52:05
- Label: Big Deal
- Producer: Bob Kulick, Bruce Bouillet

Professional ratings
Review scores
Source	Rating
AllMusic	2.5/5 stars

Metallic Attack: The Ultimate Tribute is a tribute album to heavy metal band Metallica. Motörhead's cover of "Whiplash" from this album won a Grammy for "Best Metal Performance" in 2005. The album contains covers of songs from Metallica's first five studio albums.

== Track listing ==
#	Title	Band/Performers	Original album	Length
1	"Whiplash"	Motörhead	Kill 'Em All	3:49
2	"Damage, Inc."	Flotsam and Jetsam	Master of Puppets	4:16
3	"Enter Sandman"	Nuno Bettencourt (Extreme; guitar); Scott Travis (Racer X, Judas Priest; drums); Tommy Victor (Prong; vocals); Joey Vera (Armored Saint, Fates Warning; bass)	Metallica	5:37
4	"Trapped Under Ice"	Death Angel	Ride the Lightning	3:58
5	"Nothing Else Matters"	Gregg Bissonette (Steve Vai, David Lee Roth; drums); Tony Franklin (Roy Harper, The Firm; bass); Bob Kulick (Meat Loaf, W.A.S.P.; rhythm guitar); Bruce Kulick (Kiss, Grand Funk Railroad; lead guitar); Joe Lynn Turner (Rainbow, Yngwie Malmsteen, Deep Purple; all vocals)	Metallica	6:30
6	"Motorbreath"	Page Hamilton (Helmet; vocals); Scott Ian (Anthrax; guitar); Rob "Blasko" Nicholson (Ozzy Osbourne, Rob Zombie; bass); Ryan Yerdon (Puddle of Mudd; drums)	Kill 'Em All	3:24
7	"Holier than Thou"	Doug Aldrich (Dio, Whitesnake; guitar); Chuck Billy (Testament; vocals); Marco Mendoza (John Sykes, Blue Murder; bass); Eric Singer (Kiss, Alice Cooper; drums); Alex Skolnick (Testament; guitar)	Metallica	3:49
8	"Master of Puppets"	Bruce Bouillet (Racer X; guitar); Randy Castillo (Ozzy Osbourne; drums); Whitfield Crane (Ugly Kid Joe; vocals); Rocky George (Suicidal Tendencies; guitar); Mike Inez (Alice in Chains, Ozzy Osbourne; bass)	Master of Puppets	8:39
9	"Eye of the Beholder"	Life After Death	...And Justice for All	6:17
10	"Creeping Death"	Dark Angel	Ride the Lightning	5:47

== See also ==
- Metallic Assault: A Tribute to Metallica
- Pianotarium: Piano Tribute to Metallica
