= Gone Phishin =

Gone Phishin': A Bluegrass Tribute to Phish

Studio album by Various Artists (Phish Tribute)
- Released: August 29, 2000
- Genre: Various
- Label: CMH Records
- Producer: Brent Truitt

Various Artists (Phish Tribute) chronology
Gone Phishin': A Bluegrass Tribute to Phish (2000)	Sharin' in the Groove (2001)

Gone Phishin': A Bluegrass Tribute to Phish is a bluegrass tribute album to the rock band Phish led by the Canadian solo artist Brent Truitt. The album features reworked instrumental versions of songs from three Phish albums: Rift, A Picture of Nectar and The Story of the Ghost. The album was successful and a sequel - Still Phishin - was released in 2002.

Both volumes are available in a double disc set titled Forever Phishin': The Bluegrass Tribute to Phish.

The album received a three-star rating from AllMusic.

== Track listing ==
No.	Title	Length
1.	"Silent in the Morning"	4:48
2.	"Glide"	3:59
3.	"Rift"	4:20
4.	"Cavern"	3:50
5.	"Wading in the Velvet Sea"	2:57
6.	"Tweezer"	4:40
7.	"Birds of a Feather"	3:24
8.	"Chalkdust Torture"	4:08
9.	"Sparkle"	4:09
10.	"Brian and Robert"	3:13
11.	"Water in the Sky"	2:25
12.	"Fast Enough for You"	3:44
Total length:		49:37

== Personnel ==
- Brent Truitt: acoustic and gut string guitars, mandolin
- Earl Palmer: acoustic and gut string guitars
- Richard Bailey: banjo
- Rob Ickes: dobro
- Tim Crouch: fiddle
- Byron House: bass
