= All You Need Is Blood =

Single by Beatallica
- Released: May 2008
- Recorded: Milwaukee, Wisconsin
- Genre: Rock; comedy rock
- Length: 3:02 (radio edit)
- Label: Oglio

Professional ratings
Review scores
Source	Rating
AllMusic	2.5/5 stars

"All You Need Is Blood" is the name of the first single released by mash-up band Beatallica, a group known for their combination of Beatles music and Metallica lyrics and riffs. The song is a parody of the Beatles' song "All You Need Is Love". In the same tradition of the Beatles, the cover features the members of Beatallica holding signs that read the song title in different languages, and each track (except for the last) begins with a musical quote from a different national anthem.

The maxi single contains fourteen tracks, each in a different language except for the last track, which is a radio edit of the American English version. Beatallibangers (fans) worldwide submitted the lyrics which were used and unedited by the band. It was released on May 20, 2008.

The Japanese CD import version, which includes a bonus track of the song in Japanese, was released by Sony/ATV on October 8, 2008.

As of Oct. 2008, Beatallica has recorded and released 14 different language versions of this song and they have left the project as an ongoing endeavor. Beatallibangers worldwide may submit new language versions directly to the band via their website.

== Track listings ==
1. "All You Need Is Blood" (American English) – 4:02
2. "Você só precisa sangue" (Brazilian Portuguese) – 3:28
3. "Kõigil vaja on verd" (Estonian) – 4:00
4. "Tu n'as besoin que de sang" (French) – 3:38
5. "Alle sie bedarf ist Blut" (German) – 3:51
6. "Vad az életem" (Hungarian) – 3:48
7. "כל שצריך זה דם" (Kol Shetzarikh Ze Dam") (Hebrew) – 3:44
8. "Quel che ti serve è sangue" (Italian) – 3:40
9. "Todo lo que necesitas es sangre" (Mexican Spanish) – 3:51
10. "Het enige dat je nodig hebt is bloed" (Dutch) – 3:41
11. "Potrzebujesz krwi" (Polish) – 3:56
12. "Вся нужно кровь" (Vsya nuzhno krov') (Russian) – 4:12
13. "피가 필요해" (Piga pilyohe) (Korean) – 3:58
14. "All You Need Is Blood" (radio edit) – 3:02
15. "血こそすべて" (Chi ko so subete) (Japanese; bonus track on Japanese release) – 3:57

== Production ==
- Recorded at: Bobby Peru's Blood Bank, Milwaukee, Wisconsin by Flemball Rasmartin
- Mixed and produced by: Flemball and Beatallica
- Mastered at: West West Side, New Windsor, NY by Alan Douches
- Photography by: Stanley Hanley and assisted by VVeber and MurphDawg
- Bloody participation: Trixi Pi, VVeber, MurphDawg, JoJo, Betsy, Willard. Thanks for the Monkey Bar, Di Dog!
- Art design by: GRG and Jefjamdesign.com
- Art concept by: Beatallica and Flemball
- Thanks to the translators: Yookyung Sung and Chin-A Choi, Mi Jung Trepanier, Letici Olivera, Kristel Kruuleht, Robert Filipowski, Marco Colombo, Mark Smids, Louie Tisdale, Yoni Alkan, Vajda Gabor, Ed Gerber, Lost German Beatallibanger

== Japanese import ==
Released on Oct. 8, 2008 (Sony Music Japan International Inc.). The CD import includes all of the tracks from the "All You Need is Blood" May 2008 release plus a new Japanese version of the song, recorded specifically for this CD. A limited-edition version was also released the same day that includes a bonus DVD (NTSC region 2) which has a 6:22 band interview, originally seen on the Japanese website www.werockcity.com.
