= Beatallica =

American band

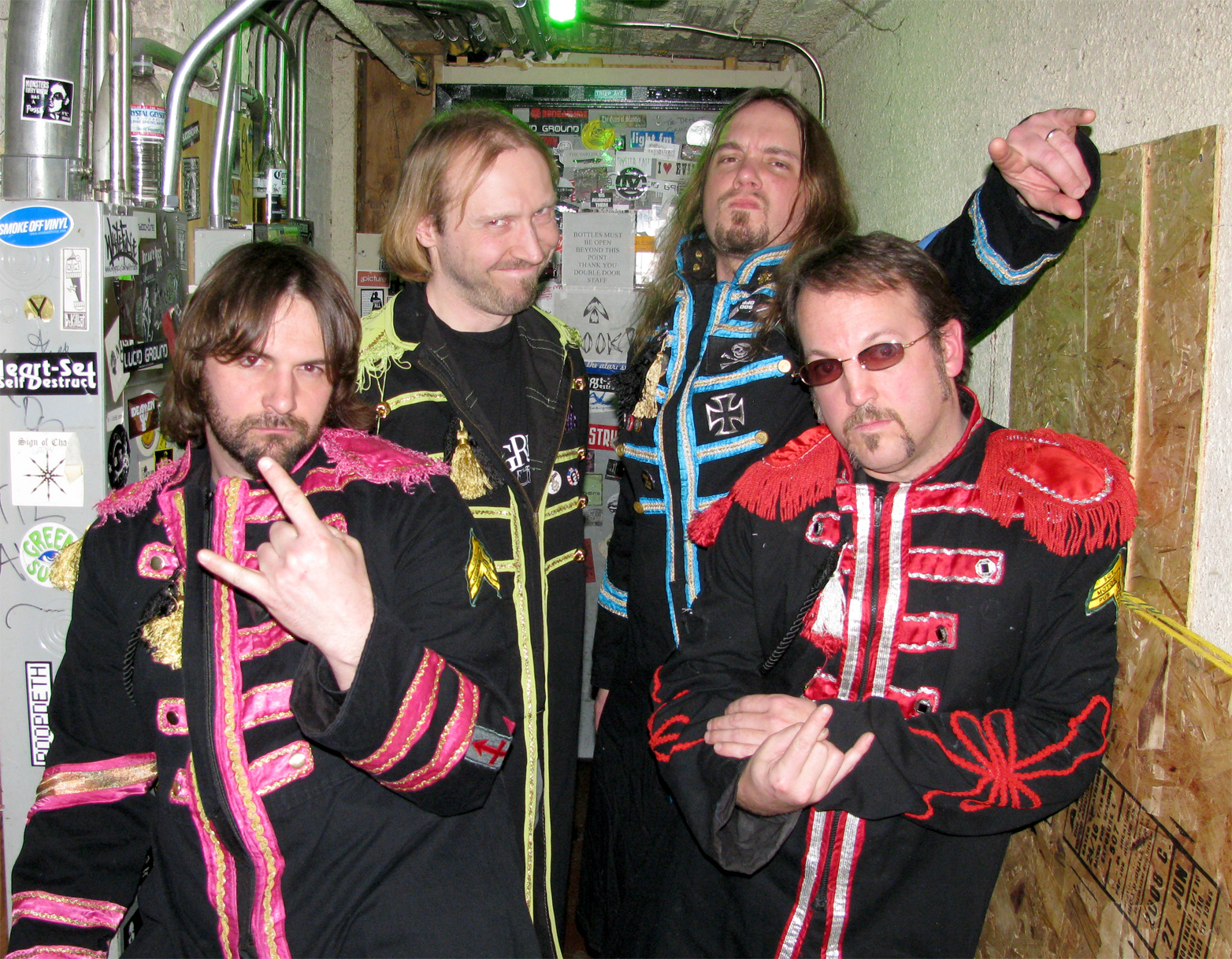
- (Left to Right) Ringo Larz, Jaymz Lennfield, Kliff McBurtney, Grg Hammetson

Background information
- Origin: Milwaukee, Wisconsin, U.S.
- Genres: Comedy rock; heavy metal
- Years active: 2001–present
- Label: Oglio
- Members: "Jaymz Lennfield" "Grg Hammetson" "Kliff McBurtney" "Ringo Larz"
- Past members: "Krk Hammetson"
- Website: beatallica.org

Beatallica is an American mash-up band that plays music made from combinations of songs of the Beatles and Metallica. A Beatallica song is typically a blend of a Beatles song and a Metallica song with a related title (e.g. "The Thing That Should Not Let It Be", combining The Beatles' "Let It Be" and Metallica's "The Thing That Should Not Be" or "And Justice for All My Loving" combining Metallica's "And Justice for All" and the Beatles' "All My Loving"), though sometimes just a Beatles song will be used as a basis with modified lyrics. The lyrics slip back and forth between the two songs, or occasionally neither, in lieu of original lyrics comically referencing Metallica, heavy metal music, or the heavy metal community. While the scansion and melody are usually Beatles-based, the music is played metal style with some Metallica riffs and solos thrown in. Consistent quirks made in the lyrics also criticize glam metal much in the fashion that thrash metal fans would do, as well as many references to blood. Their version of "I Want to Hold Your Hand", called "I Want to Choke Your Band", is an example of their criticism towards glam metal.

Although facing some misunderstandings in the media, members of Metallica itself have repeatedly praised the comedic styling of the group. For example, Kirk Hammett has publicly remarked point-blank, "I think it's cool," and, "It's just fun for me." James Hetfield and Lars Ulrich have also been friendly with the band.

== History ==
The project was founded in 2001 by original guitarist "Krk Hammetson" and singer "Jaymz Lennfield". The EP A Garage Dayz Nite was recorded for the annual Spoof Fest concert held in Milwaukee, as a memento of that year's concert. A few dozen copies of the EP were handed out to friends. Later that year, one of those CDs made its way to Milwaukee resident Dr. David Dixon, who created a web page that included mp3s of the songs and he named the band "Beatallica". The band was unaware of the webpage until Dixon finally met them in the summer of 2002, carrying a stack of fan emails from all around the world. Beatallica gave the webpage its blessings, and after further urgings from its internet fanbase, recorded the EP Beatallica, also known as The Grey Album, releasing it online on April 1, 2004.

Later in 2004, the band (including bassist "Kliff McBurtney" and drummer "Ringo Larz") started to perform at live venues nationally and internationally, with a stage show incorporating elements from both Beatles and Metallica performances. They also played as an opening act for Dream Theater; Mike Portnoy even joined the band on stage playing drums for one song.

During 2005 and 2006 the band toured around the world, playing over 60 shows, including their first UK show in London on April 26, 2006. Beatallica went on to perform with the likes of Motörhead, Testament, Kreator, Sepultura, and LA Guns and play huge summer festivals worldwide, including Milwaukee's Summerfest, Germany's Earthshaker Festival, The Netherlands' Kings of Metal festival, and Korea's Busan International Rock Festival.

In 2007, the band's current lineup of Jaymz Lennfield (lead vocals, rhythm guitar), Grg Hammetson (lead guitar), Kliff McBurtney (lead bass, backing vocals) and Ringo Larz (drums) went into the studio to re-record many of Krk and Jaymz' original songs and write some new compositions for their official debut, Sgt. Hetfield's Motorbreath Pub Band.

May 2008 marked the release of Beatallica's single "All You Need Is Blood", recorded in 13 languages as a worldwide thank-you to the network of Beatallica fans known as Beatallibangers. The band added Belgium, Czech Republic, and Poland to the list of places they have toured. Sgt. Hetfield's Motorbreath Pub Band was released in Poland on the label Metal Mind Productions.

September and October 2008 saw the release of both album Sgt. Hetfield's Motorbreath Pub Band and single "All You Need is Blood" by Sony-ATV in Japan. Both Japanese CD versions contain bonus tracks.

On April 1, 2009, Beatallica met Metallica backstage after Metallica's show in Paris. This was the first time that both bands had met each other in person. Both bands had communicated with each other over the years, as they continue to do.

On August 4, 2009, Masterful Mystery Tour, the band's second full-length album, was released internationally. An official music video for the first single, "Hero of the Day Tripper", was made with the band starring as hesh 1970s superheroes saving a party from the clutches of four Big Sleazers.

On September 9, 2009 (September 11 in Germany), Masterful Mystery Tour was released by Sony-ATV in Japan. The Japanese album version includes two bonus tracks, live versions of "I Want to Choke Your Band" and "Revol-ooh-tion", recorded in concert in Milwaukee, Wisconsin.

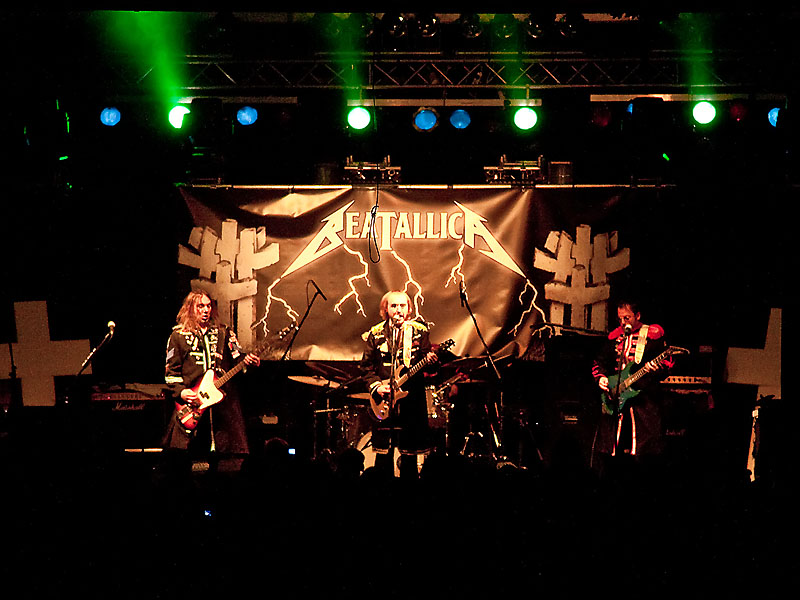
Beatallica performing live in Leipzig, 2009

The CD contains a bonus track, Beatallica's cover of the JBO song "Eine Guten Tag Zum Sterben" (English translation: "A Good Day for Dying"). Beatallica recorded this cover song singing in German, making this the second song they have released singing in German. Beatallica's cover version of the song was also included on the JBO 2009 album I Don't Like Metal – I Love It (Limited Edition version that includes a bonus CD).

Winter Plunderband was released on November 17, 2009. It is Beatallica's first holiday-season release. The (EP) album is only available as a CD at Beatallica live shows (very limited pressing) and can also be purchased as a digital download, which includes digital booklet with artwork, lyrics and photos (including Beatallica and Metallica together). The songs included are covers of Paul McCartney's "Wonderful Christmastime" and John Lennon and Yoko Ono's "Happy Christmas (War Is Over)" and also the first two Beatallica original songs, "Hella Day For Holiday" and "Heretic".

Beatallica toured Germany in December 2009 supporting JBO, who were celebrating their 20th anniversary. During the tour Jaymz would join JBO on stage to sing "Ein Guter Tag Zum Sterben" in German. On the final night of the tour in Berlin, JBO (mainly Vito C.) hijacked Beatallica's set by playing AC/DC's song "Highway to Hell" on guitar from backstage. Beatallica had no idea what was going on and thought a CD somehow was being played in error from the soundboard. During JBO's final set, Beatallica came out on stage wearing JBO's pink robes, which they stole from their dressing room, and took over the stage dancing around and drinking. Jaymz used a "Beatallica Arschwaschlappen" to wipe Hannes Holzmann's face, much to the amusement of the sold-out audience.

March 5, 2009, saw the release for Beatallica's second (and third) official video, entitled "Fuel on the Hill (and Benzin auf dem Berg)".

On April 16, 2013, Beatallica's third album, Abbey Load, was released. Unlike other Beatallica albums, the songs on this album maintain the original lyrics written by the Beatles.

On November 12, 2021, their fourth album, The Devolver Album, was released, with a preview of the first song, "Wherever and Everywhere", being released on the band's official YouTube channel on October 1, 2021.

== Legal problems ==
To avoid legal problems, the band maintained a strict non-commercial policy (all songs were available for free download) and shrouded themselves in anonymity (all names mentioned above are stage names, but their real names were revealed in interviews and, hence, also appear in this article). Metallica were aware of the spoof band's existence and never threatened to take any legal action; Lars Ulrich, James Hetfield and Kirk Hammett have all publicly stated that they enjoy Beatallica's music.

On February 17, 2005, a cease-and-desist notice was sent to David Dixon (and the band's web host) by Sony/ATV Music Publishing, a company which holds rights to most of The Beatles' catalog. The notice states that the "music", "news" and "merchandise" sections of the official Beatallica website constitute a copyright violation and should therefore be taken down. In response to this, a petition requesting Sony/ATV Music Publishing to retract its threat of legal action was created. The band was saved from further legal action by Metallica drummer Lars Ulrich, who offered to provide assistance with legal negotiations and also asked Metallica's longtime attorney to try to defuse the situation with Sony. Sony ultimately reached an agreement with Beatallica and their new label Oglio Records, and an official Beatallica recording was released in July 2007 entitled Sgt. Hetfield's Motorbreath Pub Band.

== Members, former members, special guests ==
Name	Reference(s)	Real name	Notes
Jaymz Lennfield	James Hetfield, John Lennon	Michael "Tinker" Tierney	vocals, lyrics, songwriting, rhythm guitar
Grg Hammetson III	George Harrison, Kirk Hammett	Jeff Hamilton	lead guitar, backing vocals
Kliff McBurtney	Cliff Burton, Paul McCartney	Paul Terrien; Lee Bruso (2004–2005); Troy Butero (2001–2004)	bass guitar, backing and occasional lead vocals
Ringo Larz	Ringo Starr, Lars Ulrich	Ryan Charles	drums; also performs "Lou Reed"'s vocals in a parody of "The View"
Flemball Rasmartin	Flemming Rasmussen, George Martin	Shane Olivo	producer
Dave Newkid	Dave Mustaine, Jason Newsted	David Benton	touring bassist, backing vocals
Grg Hammetson	George Harrison, Kirk Hammett	Jeff Salzman	lead guitar, backing vocals (2006–2008)
Krk Hammetson	George Harrison, Kirk Hammett	Michael Brandenburg	lead guitar, backing vocals (2001–2006)
Diablo Mysterioso	L'Angelo Misterioso	unknown	guitar, special guest
Marshall	John Marshall	Sean Williamson	guitar, special guest, backing vocals
Joey Nicol	Joey Jordison, Jimmie Nicol	Mike Portnoy	drums, special guest
Billy Prestaine	Billy Preston, Dave Mustaine	Paul Kneevers	keyboards, special guest
Doctor Robert Stujillo	Robert Trujillo, Doctor Robert	Steve Post	bass guitar, backing vocals (2021–)

=== Timeline ===
(Kliff McBurtney has been three different people over the course of the band's history, but unlike Grg Hammettson, the name was not changed)

== Discography ==
Until 2007, Beatallica's recordings were only available as MP3 and FLAC downloads.

- (2001) A Garage Dayz Nite (EP)
- (2004) Beatallica (EP)
- (2007) Sgt. Hetfield's Motorbreath Pub Band
- (2008) All You Need Is Blood (maxi-single)
- (2009) Masterful Mystery Tour
- (2009) Winter Plunderband (EP)
- (2013) Abbey Load
- (2021) The Devolver Album
