= Reaching for the Moon =

Reaching for the Moon may refer to:

- Reaching for the Moon (1917 film), a silent adventure film
- Reaching for the Moon (1930 film), a film musical
- "Reaching for the Moon" (song), written by Irving Berlin for the 1930 film
- Reaching for the Moon (album), a 1991 album by jazz singer Roseanna Vitro
- Reaching for the Moon (2013 film), a Brazilian biographical drama film
