= Old Flames =

1993 studio album by Sonny Rollins

Studio album by Sonny Rollins
- Released: 1993
- Recorded: July–August 1993
- Genre: Jazz
- Length: 55:17
- Label: Milestone
- Producer: Sonny Rollins

Sonny Rollins chronology
Here's to the People (1991)	Old Flames (1993)	Sonny Rollins + 3 (1995)

Old Flames is a studio album by jazz saxophonist Sonny Rollins, released on the Milestone label in 1993, featuring performances by Rollins with Clifton Anderson, Tommy Flanagan, Bob Cranshaw and Jack DeJohnette with Jon Faddis, Byron Stripling, Alex Brofsky and Bob Stewart added on two tracks which were arranged by Jimmy Heath.

== Reception ==
Professional ratings
Review scores
Source	Rating
AllMusic	4/5 stars
The Penguin Guide to Jazz Recordings	3/4 stars

The AllMusic review by Scott Yanow calls the album "Comfortable and occasionally passionate music by one of the classic tenor-saxophonists".

== Track listing ==
All compositions by Sonny Rollins except as indicated

1. "Darn That Dream" (Eddie DeLange, Jimmy Van Heusen) – 6:56
2. "Where or When" (Lorenz Hart, Richard Rodgers) – 8:09
3. "My Old Flame" (Sam Coslow, Arthur Johnston) – 7:15
4. "Times Slimes" – 6:58
5. "I See Your Face Before Me" (Howard Dietz, Arthur Schwartz) – 9:41
6. "Delia" (Franz Lehár) – 9:48
7. "Prelude to a Kiss" (Duke Ellington, Irving Gordon, Irving Mills) – 7:18

- Recorded in NY on July–August, 1993

== Personnel ==
- Sonny Rollins - tenor saxophone
- Clifton Anderson - trombone
- Tommy Flanagan - piano
- Bob Cranshaw - electric bass
- Jack DeJohnette - drums
- Jon Faddis, Byron Stripling - flugelhorn (tracks 1 & 7)
- Alex Brofsky - French horn (tracks 1 & 7)
- Bob Stewart - tuba (tracks 1 & 7)
- Jimmy Heath - arranger, conductor (tracks 1 & 7)
