= Cool Yule (song) =

Single by Louis Armstrong with the Commanders
- Released: 1953
- Recorded: October, 1953
- Studio: Decca, London, UK
- Genre: Christmas, Jazz
- Length: 2:54
- Songwriter(s): Steve Allen

"Cool Yule" is a 1953 Christmas song written by Steve Allen and introduced by Louis Armstrong.

It was covered by Roseanna Vitro in 1986 on her album The Time of My Life: Roseanna Vitro Sings the Songs of Steve Allen (released 1999), by Bette Midler in 2006 for her album Cool Yule, and by The Brian Setzer Orchestra on their 2005 album Dig That Crazy Christmas.

== Popular culture ==
The song is featured over the opening and closing credits of the 2001 movie Serendipity, starring John Cusack and Kate Beckinsale. It was also heard on the NBC holiday special Merry Madagascar when Alex, Marty, Gloria, Melman, and the penguins rush to deliver gifts.

In October 2013 the song was used in the UK for a Christmas advert for DFS.
