= Centrepiece (disambiguation) =

A centrepiece (or centerpiece) is a decorative object on a table.

Centrepiece or Centerpiece may also refer to:

- Centrepiece, a TV series about centrepieces — see List of Quibi original programming
- "Centerpiece" (song), a 1958 jazz standard
