= Conviction: Thoughts of Bill Evans =

Conviction: Thoughts Of Bill Evans

Studio album by Roseanna Vitro
- Released: March 6, 2001
- Recorded: July 2000; Tedesco Studios, N.J.
- Genre: Vocal jazz
- Length: 48:50
- Label: A Records; AL 73208
- Producer: Paul Wickliffe

Roseanna Vitro chronology
| The Time of My Life: Roseanna Vitro Sings the Songs of Steve Allen (1999) | Conviction: Thoughts Of Bill Evans (2001) | Tropical Postcards (2004) |

Professional ratings
Review scores
| Source | Rating |
|---|---|
| All About Jazz | "Highly recommended." |
| AllMusic | 4.5/5 stars |
| JazzTimes | favorable |
| Los Angeles Times | favorable |

External audio
- You may listen to "Funkallero" here

Conviction: Thoughts of Bill Evans is the 8th album by jazz singer Roseanna Vitro, released in 2001 by A Records, an imprint of Challenge Records International.

== Reception ==
AllMusic awarded the album 4½ stars out of five, with reviewer Alex Henderson calling it "a consistently interesting date" fueled by a host of supporting players well versed in Evans' music, and by Vitro's uniquely personal take on a variety of Evans themes and belatedly added lyrics.

== Track listing ==
All music composed by Bill Evans except where indicated.

1. "My Bells" (Bill Evans, Gene Lees) - 4:32
2. "Remembering the Rain" (Evans, Carol Hall) - 4:13
3. "Two Lonely People" [sic] (Evans, Carol Hall) - 4:20
4. "Prelude to a Funk" (Roseanna Vitro, Paul Wickliffe) - 0:22
5. "Funkallero" (Evans, Vítor Martins, Alan and Marilyn Bergman) - 3:00
6. "Only Child" (Evans, Roger Schore) - 5:14
7. "Conviction" (Vitro) - 3:33
8. "Turn Out the Stars" (Evans, Lees) - 4:28
9. "Waltz for Debby" (Evans, Lees) - 4:40
10. "In April" (Evans, Roger Schore) - 4:23
11. "Very Early" (Evans, Carol Hall) - 5:40
12. "Letter to Evan" (Evans) - 4:25

== Personnel ==
- Vocals – Roseanna Vitro – vocals
- Piano – Fred Hersch, Mark Soskin, Allen Farnham
- Bass – Eddie Gomez, Scott Lee, Bob Bowen
- Drums – Adrian D'Souza
