= Jerome Harris =

American jazz musician

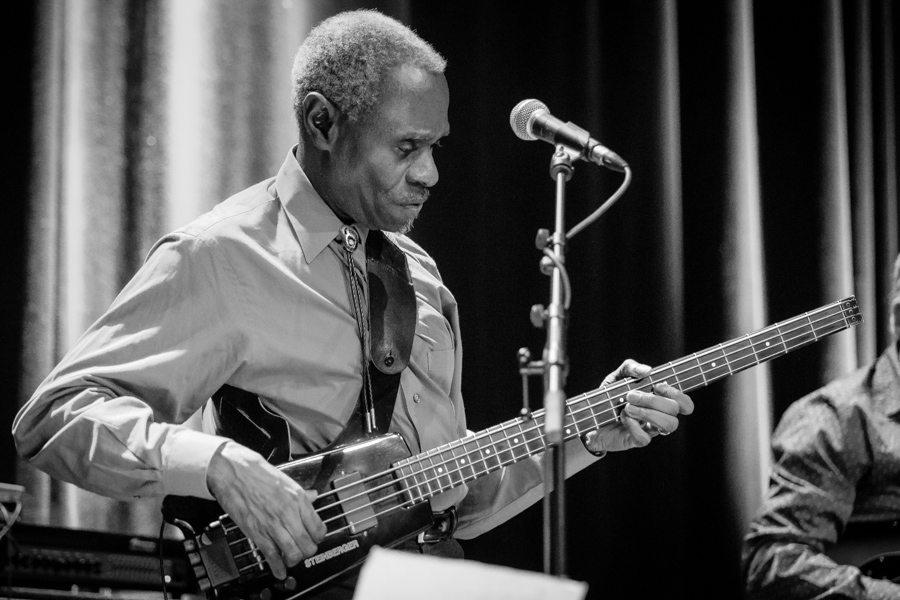
- On stage in Oslo in 2017

Background information
- Born: April 5, 1953 (age 73); Flushing, New York
- Genres: Jazz
- Occupation: Musician
- Instruments: Guitar, bass
- Years active: 1970s–present
- Labels: Muse, Polygram
- Website: Official site

Jerome Harris (born April 5, 1953) is an American jazz musician specializing in electric and acoustic bass guitar, electric guitar, voice, and occasionally lap steel and small percussion.

He came to prominence in 1978 playing bass guitar and guitar with tenor saxophonist Sonny Rollins, with whom he would perform and record intermittently until the mid-1990s. Harris went on to work with drummers Jack DeJohnette, Paul Motian, Bob Moses and Bobby Previte, clarinetist David Krakauer, trombonist Ray Anderson, pianist/organist/vocalist Amina Claudine Myers, and saxophonist/clarinetists Don Byron, Marty Ehrlich and Hayes Greenfield. Harris has recorded as a bandleader. Hidden in Plain View (1995), a tribute to saxophonist Eric Dolphy, is described by critic Michael G. Nastos as "the finest [recording] of Harris' small discography."

== Discography ==
=== As leader ===
- 1986 Algorithms (Minor Music)
- 1990 In Passing (Muse)
- 1995 Hidden in Plain View (New World)
- 1999 Rendezvous (Stereophile)

=== As sideman ===
With Ray Anderson

- 1994 Don't Mow Your Lawn (Enja)
- 1998 Funkorific (Enja)

With Jack DeJohnette

- 1997 Oneness
- 1999 Festival (ECM)

With Marty Ehrlich

- 2000 Malinke's Dance (Omnitone)
- 2010 Fables (Tzadik)
- 2013 A Trumpet in the Morning (New World)

With Michael Gregory Jackson

- 1979 Gifts (Arista Novus)
- 1979 Hearts & Center (Arista Novus)

With David Krakauer

- 2012 Pruflas: Book of Angels Volume 18 (Tzadik)
- 2016 Checkpoint

With Oliver Lake

- 1982 Jump Up (Gramavision)
- 1983 Plug It (Gramavision)

With Bob Moses

- 1984 Visit with the Great Spirit (Gramavision)
- 1987 The Story of Moses (Gramavision)

With Amina Claudine Myers

- 1986 Country Girl (Minor Music)
- 1989 In Touch (Novus)
- 1993 Women in (E)Motion

With Bobby Previte

- 1990 Empty Suits (Gramavision)
- 1991 Music of the Moscow Circus (Gramavision)
- 1994 Slay the Suitors (Avant)
- 1997 My Man in Sydney (Enja)
- 1998 Dangerous Rip (Enja)

With Hank Roberts

- 1990 Birds of Prey (JMT)
- 2011 Everything Is Alive (Winter & Winter)

With Sonny Rollins

- 1979 Don't Ask (Milestone)
- 1987 Dancing in the Dark (Milestone)
- 1989 Falling in Love with Jazz (Milestone)
- 1991 Here's to the People (Milestone)
- 1991 Don't Stop the Carnival (Milestone)

With Ned Rothenberg

- 1991 Overlays (Moers)
- 1995 Real and Imagined Time (Moers)
- 1998 Port of Entry (Intuition)
- 2004 Parting (Moers)
- 2004 Harbinger (Animul)
- 2007 Inner Diaspora (Tzadik)

With Adam Rudolph

- 2011 Both/And (Meta)
- 2015 Turning Towards the Light (Cuneiform)

With Bob Stewart

- 1989 Goin' Home (JMT)
- 1996 Then and Now (Postcards)
- 2014 Mind the Gap (Sunnyside)

With others

- 1980 Jon Hassell and Brian Eno, Fourth World, Vol. 1: Possible Musics (Editions EG)
- 1983 George Russell, Live in an American Time Spiral (Soul Note)
- 1985 Bill Frisell, Rambler (ECM)
- 1985 Jay Hoggard, Riverside Dance (India Navigation)
- 1988 Julius Hemphill, Julius Hemphill Big Band (Elektra Musician)
- 1989 Mark Helias, Desert Blue (Enja)
- 1992 Jeanne Lee, Natural Affinities (Owl)
- 1993 John Clark, Il Suono (CMP)
- 1994 Robert Dick, Third Stone from the Sun (New World)
- 1994 Henry Threadgill, Song Out of My Trees (Black Saint)
- 1998 Pheeroan Aklaff, Global Mantras (Modern Masters)
- 2000 Don Byron, A Fine Line (Blue Note)
- 2001 Thurman Barker, Time Factor
- 2004 Sam Newsome, 24/7 (Satchmo)
- 2005 Paul Motian, Garden of Eden (ECM)
- 2013 Jaki Byard, Inch by Inch (GM)
- 2014 Roy Nathanson, Complicated Day (Enja)
- 2021 Julius Hemphill, The Boyé Multi-National Crusade for Harmony (New World)
