= Centerpiece (song) =

1958 jazz standard

"Centerpiece" is a 1958 jazz standard. It was written by Harry Edison and Jon Hendricks.

The song is a love song, with the lyrics indicating that the singer feels incomplete without his lover. Each of the two verses ends with the couplet:

But nothing's any good without you
'Cause baby you're my centerpiece

== Covers ==
- Joni Mitchell incorporated the song into a medley, with her own "Harry's House", on her 1975 album The Hissing of Summer Lawns .
- Jazz singer Roseanna Vitro recorded the song on her 1984 debut LP, Listen Here.

== See also ==
- List of jazz standards
