= The Music of Randy Newman =

Studio album by Roseanna Vitro
- Released: May 10, 2011
- Recorded: November 9, 2009 and January 22, 2010 at Charlestown Road Studio, Hampton, NJ
- Genre: Vocal jazz
- Length: 53:39
- Label: Motéma Music; MTM-63
- Producer: Paul Wickliffe, Roseanna Vitro

Roseanna Vitro chronology
The Delirium Blues Project: Serve or Suffer (2008)	The Music of Randy Newman (2011)	Clarity: Music of Clare Fischer (2014)

Professional ratings
Review scores
Source	Rating
All About Jazz	4/5 stars
AllMusic	4/5 stars
Down Beat	4.5/5 stars
JazzTimes	favorable

The Music of Randy Newman is the 12th album by jazz singer Roseanna Vitro, recorded in 2009 and 2010, released in 2011 on the Motéma label. It received a 2012 Grammy nomination in the category of the Best Vocal Jazz Album.

== Reception ==
The album received 4½ stars from DownBeat and 4 stars each from AllMusic and All About Jazz. The latter notes Newman's and Vitro's "shared Southern heritage," while praising "Vitro's sophisticated interpretations." AllMusic's Ken Dryden applauds Vitro's novel approach to a mix of familiar and obscure material, singling out violinist Sarah Caswell's sometimes "sublime" contributions:

Vitro has a lot of fun with Newman's hilarious description of attending a pot party in "Mama Told Me Not to Come," with Caswell's whimsical licks complementing the leader's playful, outgoing vocal. The singer captures the essence of Newman's sardonic "Baltimore," though she transforms it with a brisk setting, adding guitarist Steve Cardenas. Vitro's dramatic interpretation of "In Germany Before the War" is also a high point.

DownBeat's Kirk Silbee likewise notes Vitro's compatibility with the subject of her tribute:

Her soulful alto connects beautifully with Newman’s great feel for Southern music forms. Pianist Mark Soskin, away from his Sonny Rollins’ sideman role, accompanies effectively throughout, and Sara Caswell’s emotionally charged violin provides a sympathetic foil for Vitro. This album is awfully good.

== Track listing ==
Words and music by Randy Newman.

1. "Last Night I had a Dream" - 4:55
2. "Sail Away" - 5:48
3. "If I Didn't Have You - 6:16
4. "Every Time It Rains" - 4:05
5. "Baltimore" - 5:59
6. "In Germany Before the War" - 4:35
7. "Mama Told Me Not to Come" - 4:36
8. "I Will Go Sailing No More" - 6:06
9. "Feels Like Home" - 6:02
10. "Losing You" - 5:17

== Personnel ==
- Vocals, arrangements – Roseanna Vitro
- Piano, arrangements – Mark Soskin
- Violin – Sara Caswell
- Bass – Dean Johnson
- Drums – Tim Horner

Special Guests

- Percussion – Jamey Haddad
- Guitar – Steve Cardenas
