= Passion Dance (Roseanna Vitro album) =

Studio album by Roseanna Vitro
- Released: January 23, 1996
- Recorded: July 19, 1994 and January 1995
- Genre: Vocal jazz
- Length: 64:21
- Label: Telarc Jazz; CD-83385
- Producer: Paul Wickliffe

Roseanna Vitro chronology
Softly (1993)	Passion Dance (1996)	Catchin' Some Rays: The Music of Ray Charles (1997)

Professional ratings
Review scores
Source	Rating
AllMusic	4.5/5 stars

External audio
- You may listen to "Passion Dance" here

Passion Dance is the fifth album by jazz singer Roseanna Vitro, released in January 1996 on the Telarc Jazz label.

== Reception ==
"[A] superior set by a very appealing singer," writes AllMusic's Scott Yanow in his review of Vitro's Telarc debut. Commending Vitro as "a versatile vocalist who is not afraid to take chances," Yanow also cites the contributions of both pianist/musical director Kenny Werner and a roster of guest artists including "altoist Gary Bartz, trumpeter Tim Hagans, bassist Christian McBride and drummer Elvin Jones."

A contemporaneous review by Washington Post music critic Mike Joyce is similarly impressed:

A less talented singer might find herself intimidated by the company Vitro keeps on her new album. [...] Yet Vitro consistently holds her own on this diverse collection of standards and original compositions. She conjures, by turns, the warmth, dizziness and passion of being in love.

== Track listing ==
1. "Out of This World" (Harold Arlen, Johnny Mercer) – 5:29
2. "Long As You're Livin'" (Roseanna Vitro) – 6:16
3. "Returned to Me (The Bird)" (Tex Allen) – 5:32
4. "Freedom Jazz Dance" (Eddie Harris, Oscar Hammerstein II) – 5:18
5. "For Heaven's Sake" (Sherman Edwards, Don Meyer, and Elise Bretton) – 5:03
6. "Whisper Not" (Benny Golson, Leonard Feather) – 4:49
7. "Simone" (Frank Foster, Cheryl Pyle) – 7:22
8. "Blue Monk" (Thelonious Monk, Abbey Lincoln) – 5:14
9. "Passion Dance" (McCoy Tyner, Roseanna Vitro) – 6:40
10. "More Than You Know" (Vincent Youmans, Billy Rose, Edward Eliscu) – 7:19
11. "Strollin' (Nostalgia in Times Square)" (Charles Mingus, George Gordon) – 5:19

== Personnel ==
- Vocals – Roseanna Vitro
- Piano – Kenny Werner, Larry Willis
- Bass – Christian McBride, Richie Goods, Ratzo Harris
- Drums – Elvin Jones, Clarence Penn, Jamey Haddad
- Guitar – Vic Juris, Romero Lubambo
- Saxophone – Gary Bartz, Tim Ries
- Guest vocalist – Kevin Mahogany
