= The Delirium Blues Project: Serve or Suffer =

Live album by Roseanna Vitro and Kenny Werner
- Released: March 25, 2008
- Recorded: August 14–19, 2007 at the Blue Note, New York
- Genre: Vocal jazz, R&B, blues
- Length: 60:21
- Label: Half Note Records; HN4534
- Producer: Jeffrey Levenson

Roseanna Vitro chronology
Live at the Kennedy Center (2007)	The Delirium Blues Project: Serve or Suffer (2008)	The Music of Randy Newman (2011)

Professional ratings
Review scores
Source	Rating
All About Jazz	3/5 stars
AllMusic	4.5/5 stars
JazzTimes	favorable
Vintage Guitar	favorable

External audio
- You may listen to "What is Hip?" here

The Delirium Blues Project: Serve or Suffer is the first album released under the joint leadership of Roseanna Vitro and Kenny Werner. It was recorded live at the Blue Note in New York in August 2007, and released in 2008 on the Half Note label.

== Reception ==
On a 1-to-5 scale, All About Jazz awarded the album 3 stars; AllMusic, 4 and a half. Writing for the former, Chris Slawecky notes Werner's "head-spinning arrangements," as well as strong soloing from trumpeter Randy Brecker, trombonist Ray Anderson, saxophonist James Carter, guitarist Adam Rogers and Werner himself on multiple keyboards. AllMusic's Ken Dryden also cites "Werner's inspired charts," as well as "Vitro's expressive vocals":

Vitro's moving vocal in the moody "Blue" (first recorded by Lambert, Hendricks & Ross with Annie Ross singing lead), backed by the dramatic horns, is breathtaking; her blues-drenched take of Mose Allison's "Everybody's Crying Mercy" is pure fun. Bassist John Pattitucci provides Vitro's sole backing for the simmering take of "In the Dark" (in honor of Nina Simone). Folk-rocker Joni Mitchell's "Be Cool" helps to lighten the mood a bit, while Vitro conjures a number of soul singers with her hip take of "Cheater Man."

== Track listing ==
1. "What Is Hip?" (Emilio Castillo, John David Garibaldi, Stephen M. Kupka) - 5:59
2. "Goodnight Nelda Grebe, the Telephone Company Has Cut Us Off" (Tracy Nelson) - 9:05
3. "Blue" (Gildo Mahones, Jon Hendricks) - 7:40
4. "Be Cool" (Joni Mitchell) - 4:24
5. "Half Moon" (Janis Joplin) - 8:07
6. "In the Dark" (Lillian "Lil" Green) - 5:13
7. "Cheater Man" (Spooner Oldham, Dan Penn) - 4:45
8. "Everybody's Cryin' Mercy" (Mose Allison) - 6:42
9. "Don't Ever Let Nobody Drag Your Spirit Down" (Eric Bibb, Maria Muldaur) - 8:26

== Personnel ==
- Roseanna Vitro – vocals, arrangements
- Kenny Werner – keyboards, arrangements
- Randy Brecker – trumpet
- James Carter – tenor saxophone
- Ray Anderson – trombone
- Geoff Countryman – baritone saxophone
- Adam Rogers – guitar
- John Pattitucci – acoustic and electric bass
- Rocky Bryant – drums
