= Reaching for the Moon (song) =

Song by Irving Berlin written in 1930

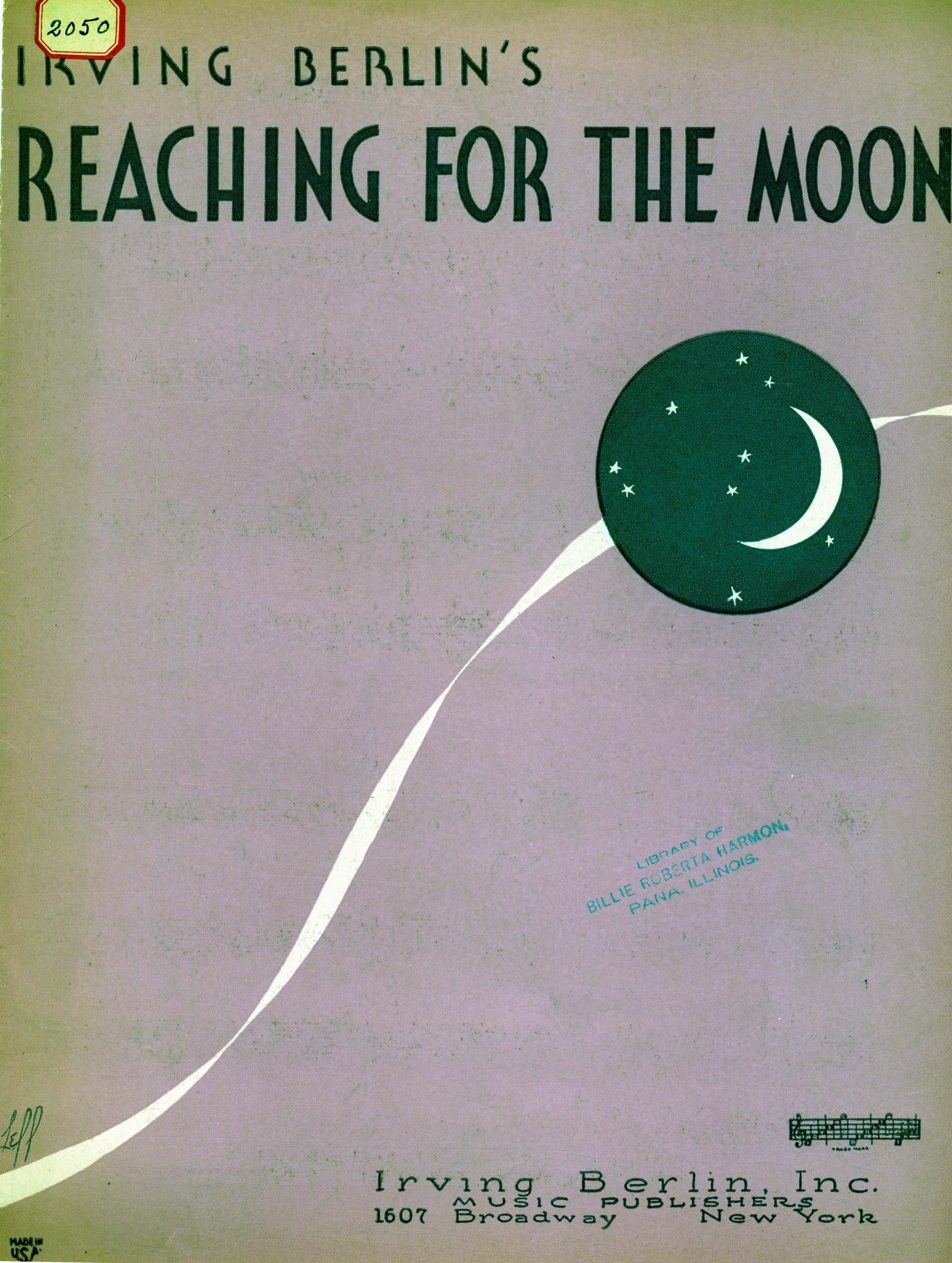
Sheet music cover, 1930

"Reaching for the Moon" is a popular song written by Irving Berlin for the 1930 musical film of the same name.

== Background ==
In 1930, United Artists prepared this original music film written by Irving Berlin with his music and lyrics. Director Edmund Goulding and Berlin fought over Goulding's decision to cut most of the songs from the film (due to the temporary disfavor of movie musicals). The film starred Douglas Fairbanks Sr. and Bebe Daniels. The title song is only used as background music.

Titles of the unused Irving Berlin songs are: "It's Yours"; "What a Lucky Break for Me"; "They're Going Down (Brokers' and Customers' Song) - which was rewritten as "Wedding and Crash"; "If You Believe" - a revised version was sung by Johnnie Ray in There's No Business Like Show Business (1954); "The Little Things in Life" - which provided hit records for Gus Arnheim and His Cocoanut Orchestra (vocal by Bing Crosby) on Victor, and Ted Wallace and His Campus Boys (vocal by Dick Dickson) on Columbia; "A Toast to Prohibition"; "You've Gotta Do Right by Me" and "(I Ask You) Is That Nice?" Bing Crosby sings "When The Folks High Up Do That Mean Lowdown", in his first solo film performance.

The title song was quite popular in 1930-31 with recordings made for every label at the time. Ruth Etting's version for Columbia was especially popular. The song is a waltz, but there was at least one fox trot arrangement of the waltz issued at the time (on Hit of the Week).

In 1917, Fairbanks produced a silent film by this same name, in which Fairbanks starred alongside Eileen Percy and Richard Cummings.

== Notable recordings ==
- Bob and Alf Pearson on a 78 rpm single (1931)
- Roy Fox and His Band (vocal by Al Bowlly) recorded the song in London for Decca Records on March 5, 1931 (GB-2717-3: Dec F-2279).
- Ella Fitzgerald - Ella Fitzgerald Sings the Irving Berlin Songbook (1958)
- Frank Sinatra - Moonlight Sinatra (1965)
- Roseanna Vitro - Reaching for the Moon (1991)
- Lizz Wright, Regina Carter - for the tribute album: We All Love Ella: Celebrating The First Lady Of Song (2007)
- Holly Cole - Holly Cole (2007)
