= G-Man (Sonny Rollins album) =

Album by Sonny Rollins

Live album by Sonny Rollins
- Released: November 1987
- Recorded: August 16, 1986
- Venue: Opus 40 in Saugerties, New York
- Genre: Jazz
- Length: 44:36
- Label: Milestone
- Producer: Lucille Rollins

Sonny Rollins chronology
The Solo Album (1985)	G-Man (1987)	Dancing in the Dark (1987)

G-Man is a live album by American jazz saxophonist Sonny Rollins. It was recorded at an outdoor concert on August 16, 1986, held at Opus 40 in Saugerties, New York. The concert was filmed for a documentary about Rollins, directed by Robert Mugge, before being released on record in November 1987 by Milestone Records. G-Man received positive reviews from critics, some of whom called it one of Rollins' best albums.

== Background ==
The performances on G-Man were recorded on August 16, 1986, at Opus 40 in Saugerties, where Rollins performed an outdoor concert with an ensemble that featured trombonist Clifton Anderson, bass player Bob Cranshaw, pianist Mark Soskin, and drummer Marvin "Smitty" Smith. The concert was originally filmed for Saxophone Colossus, Robert Mugge's documentary on Rollins. Some tenor saxophone parts were recorded in studio on April 9, 1987, and overdubbed onto the track "Kim", and G-Man was released in November of that year by Milestone Records.

== Critical reception ==
Professional ratings
Review scores
Source	Rating
AllMusic	4/5 stars
The Penguin Guide to Jazz Recordings	3.5/4 stars
The Rolling Stone Album Guide	4/5 stars
The Village Voice	A+

In a contemporary review for The Village Voice, Robert Christgau wrote that Rollins' ensemble sounds inspired by his innovative and radical saxophone playing on G-Man, which he called "jazz for rock-and-rollers to cut their teeth on. It's exciting, fun, a gas, all that stuff great rock and roll is supposed to be and so rarely is these days." Larry Hollis of Cadence Magazine said it is the most satisfying record from Rollins' tenure at Milestone and highlighted the title track, calling it "an exhaustive steamroller that will stand up to return listens" because of how Rollins maintains interest with a variety of techniques and sounds: "Jagged lines breaking up smoother passages, random squeals, whinnies and shakes drawn from the honking R&B history book or dropping down into the cellar for some low register long tones sometimes split into quick octave leaps". Christgau later named it the best album of 1987 in his list for the annual Pazz & Jop critics poll, and in 1990 he named it the fourth-best album of the 1980s.

In a retrospective review for Wondering Sound, journalist Fred Kaplan cited G-Man as one of Rollins' greatest records and expressed amazement at his solos and strong rapport with the band, calling their music "head spinning". According to jazz critic Gary Giddins, the album was Rollins' "ultimate statement on the middle ground he sought between traditional constraints and free jazz—a disciplined howl of joy that seemed to steady him for the inevitable task of building a postfusion repertory". Jazz historian Scott Yanow was more reserved in his praise, writing in a review for AllMusic that Rollins is "in good form, saying little that it is new but delivering passionate messages with his typical spirit".

== Track listing ==
All compositions by Sonny Rollins, except where noted.

1. "G-Man" – 15:19
2. "Kim" – 5:58
3. "Don't Stop the Carnival" (Traditional; arranged by Rollins) – 11:18
4. "Tenor Madness" – 12:01 (CD only)

== Personnel ==
- Sonny Rollins – tenor saxophone
- Clifton Anderson – trombone
- Mark Soskin – piano
- Bob Cranshaw – electric bass
- Marvin "Smitty" Smith – drums
