= Softly (Roseanna Vitro album) =

Studio album by Roseanna Vitro
- Released: December 14, 1993
- Recorded: Skyline Studios, New York, N.Y.
- Genre: Vocal jazz
- Length: 60:30
- Label: Concord Jazz; CCD-4587
- Producer: Paul Wickliffe

Roseanna Vitro chronology
Reaching for the Moon (1991)	Softly (1993)	Passion Dance (1996)

Professional ratings
Review scores
Source	Rating
Allmusic	4.5/5 stars
Los Angeles Times	3/4 stars
Washington Post	favorable

External audio
- You may listen to "I Ain't Got Nothin' But the Blues" here

Softly is the fourth album by jazz singer Roseanna Vitro, released in December 1993 on the Concord Jazz label.

== Reception ==
AllMusic awarded the album 4½ stars, with reviewer Scott Yanow citing Vitro's proficiency with both lyrics and improvisation, as well as the strong support lent by pianist Fred Hersch and saxophonists Tim Ries and George Coleman.

The album fared well in contemporaneous reviews as well. The Los Angeles Times awarded three stars out of 4, with critic Leonard Feather commending Vitro's delivery, choice of material, and affinity for Brazilian music, although taking issue with a couple of the tempos selected – in particular, for "Softly As in a Morning Sunrise" ("tackled swiftly, as in an evening rush hour.") The Washington Post's Mike Joyce expressed no such reservations, citing the album's combination of "[c]hoice songs, distinctive interpretations, [and] sensitive musicianship":

"Falling in Love With Love," the opening track, readily reveals Vitro's gifts as a vocalist. She shapes phrases like a horn player, infusing some words with rhythmic vitality and softly attenuating others, while never losing sight of the composer's intentions. As the album unfolds. Vitro continues in the same vein, elegantly balancing jazz liberties with uncomplicated storytelling and lessons learned the hard way.

== Track listing ==
1. "Falling in Love With Love" (Lorenz Hart, Richard Rodgers) – 3:37
2. "In Summer (Estate)" (Bruno Martino, Bruno Brighetti, Jon Hendricks) – 5:36
3. "A Song for All Ages" (Fred Hersch, Cheryl Pyle) – 4:54
4. "Softly As in a Morning Sunrise" (Sigmund Romberg, Oscar Hammerstein II) – 4:38
5. "Moon and Sand" (Alec Wilder, Morty Palitz, William Engvick) – 4:24
6. "So Many Stars" (Sergio Mendes, Alan and Marilyn Bergman) – 6:05
7. "I'm Through With Love" (Gus Kahn, Fud Livingston, Matty Malneck) – 3:44
8. "Wild Is the Wind" (Dimitri Tiomkin, Ned Washington) – 6:17
9. "Life I Choose" (Tom Harrell, Cheryl Pyle) – 4:18
10. "Our Love Rolls On" (Dave Frishberg) – 3:54
11. "Nothing Like You" (Bob Dorough, Fran Landesman) – 3:07
12. "Why Try to Change Me Now?" (Cy Coleman, Joseph McCarthy) – 5:11
13. "I Ain't Got Nothin' But the Blues" (Duke Ellington, Don George) – 4:45

== Personnel ==
- Vocals – Roseanna Vitro
- Piano – Fred Hersch
- Bass – Jay Anderson
- Drums – Tom Rainey
- Tenor Saxophone – George Coleman, Tim Ries
- Percussion – Mino Cinelu
