= Live at the Kennedy Center =

Live At The Kennedy Center

Live album by Roseanna Vitro
- Released: April 11, 2006
- Recorded: September 16–17, 2005
- Genre: Vocal jazz
- Length: 65:12
- Label: Challenge Records; CR 73252
- Producer: Paul Wickliffe, Roseanna Vitro

Roseanna Vitro chronology
Tropical Postcards (2004)	Live At The Kennedy Center (2006)	The Delirium Blues Project: Serve or Suffer (2008)

Professional ratings
Review scores
Source	Rating
All About Jazz	5/5 stars
AllMusic	4.5/5 stars
JazzTimes	favorable

Live At The Kennedy Center is the 10th album by jazz singer Roseanna Vitro. Recorded over the course of two consecutive nights in September 2005, it was released the following spring by Challenge Records.

== Reception ==
The album received 4½ stars from AllMusic and 5 from All About Jazz, the latter citing pianist Kenny Werner's arrangements and "artful playing," as well as "Vitro's strong R&B chops" and "impressive command of jazz technique," while taking from both, "a rare and valuable lesson in abandonment to artistic impulse."

For AllMusic's Ken Dryden, this "adventurous concert" confirms his view of Vitro as "simply one of the best in the business," showcasing her versatility, technique, and sensitivity (the latter finding additional expression via 'the thoughtful lyric" written by Vitro for the album's final track, Bill Evans' "Epilogue.") Praising her "potent rhythm section," and, in particular, "Werner's inventive accompaniment" and "daredevil soloing," Dryden describes "the CD [a]s a perfect place to start for the novice or an automatic purchase for those already familiar with her work."

== Track listing ==
1. "Like Someone in Love" (Jimmy Van Heusen, Johnny Burke) - 4:46
2. "Like a Lover" (Dori Caymmi, Nelson Motta, Alan and Marilyn Bergman) - 6:09
3. "Please Do Something" (Betty Carter) - 5:40
4. Introduction to "Commitment" - 0:32
5. "Commitment" (Kenny Werner, Paul Wickliffe) - 7:07
6. "Worried Over You" (Eldridge Holmes) - 5:15
7. "I Think It's Going to Rain Today" (Randy Newman) - 6:12
8. "Tryin' Times" (Donny Hathaway, Leroy Hutson) - 4:58
9. "Serrado" (Djavan) - 5:02
10. Introduction to "Twelve Tone Tune" - 0:24
11. "Twelve Tone Tune" (Bill Evans, Paul Wickliffe) - 4:13
12. "Epilogue" (Bill Evans, Roseanna Vitro) - 5:35
13. "Black Coffee" (Sonny Burke, Paul Francis Webster) - 9:09

== Personnel ==
- Roseanna Vitro – vocals
- Kenny Werner – piano, arrangements
- Dean Johnson – bass
- Tim Horner – drums
