= Tropical Postcards =

Studio album by Roseanna Vitro
- Released: June 8, 2004
- Recorded: Charlestown Road Studios, Hampton, N.J.
- Genre: Vocal jazz, Brazilian jazz
- Length: 61:43
- Label: A Records; SAAL73244
- Producer: Paul Wickliffe, Roseanna Vitro

Roseanna Vitro chronology
Conviction: Thoughts Of Bill Evans (2001)	Tropical Postcards (2004)	Live At The Kennedy Center (2006)

Professional ratings
Review scores
Source	Rating
AllMusic	3.5/5 stars
JazzTimes	favorable

External audio
- You may listen to "I Just Need Your Kisses" here

Tropical Postcards is the 9th album by jazz singer Roseanna Vitro, released in 2004 by A Records, an imprint of Challenge Records International. Brazilian jazz and popular music predominate, with seven of the album's eleven tracks provided by Brazilian composers (one by Edu Lobo and two each from Jobim, Milton Nascimento, and Ivan Lins), plus one familiar standard – Sammy Fain's I'll Be Seeing You – performed as a bossa nova .

== Reception ==
AllMusic awarded the album 3½ stars; describing it as "among her best, most inspired and memorable projects," reviewer Alex Henderson cites Vitro's willingness to depart from the "all-standards-all-the-time" formula:

Vitro -- true to form -- also surprises us with some gems that jazz vocalists haven't paid nearly as much attention to, including Tom Harrell's "Terrestris" and Ivan Lins' "I Just Need Your Kisses." Clearly, Vitro is smart enough to realize that a song doesn't have to be a Tin Pan Alley warhorse to have value, and she knows how important it is for a jazz vocalist to put his/her stamp on some lesser known pearls.

== Track listing ==
1. "Song of the Jet" (Antonio Carlos Jobim, Gene Lees) - 5:43
2. "Land of Wonder (Terrestris)" (Tom Harrell, Cheryl Pyle) - 6:49
3. "I'll Be Seeing You" (Sammy Fain, Irving Kahal) - 3:54
4. "Certas Canções" (Milton Nascimento) - 5:25
5. "Kisses" (Ivan Lins, Vítor Martins, Alan and Marilyn Bergman) - 5:31
6. "I Just Need Your Kisses" (Ivan Lins, Vítor Martins, Paul Wickliffe) - 5:21
7. "Reza" (Edú Lobo, Ray Guerra) - 5:53
8. "I Remember You" (Victor Schertzinger) - 3:50
9. "Wave" (Jobim) - 5:30
10. "Cravo e Canela" (Nascimento) - 5:52
11. "In Search of My Heart" (McCoy Tyner, Roseanna Vitro) - 7:55

== Personnel ==
- Roseanna Vitro – vocals
- Kenny Werner – piano, arrangements
- Joe Lovano, Don Braden – tenor saxophone
- Chieli Minucci – guitar, electric guitar
- Dean Johnson, Robert E. Bowen – bass
- Cecil Brooks III – drums
- Mino Cinelu – percussion

With special guests Trio da Paz (on tracks #1, 3, 5, 9):

- Romero Lubambo – guitar
- Nilson Matta – bass
- Duduka da Fonseca – drums, percussion
