= Dancing in the Dark (Sonny Rollins album) =

1987 studio album by Sonny Rollins

Studio album by Sonny Rollins
- Released: 1987
- Recorded: September 15–25, 1987
- Genre: Jazz
- Length: 37:29
- Label: Milestone
- Producer: Sonny Rollins, Lucille Rollins

Sonny Rollins chronology
G-Man (1986)	Dancing in the Dark (1987)	Falling in Love with Jazz (1989)

Dancing in the Dark is a 1987 studio album by jazz saxophonist Sonny Rollins, released on the Milestone label, featuring performances by Rollins with Clifton Anderson, Mark Soskin, Jerome Harris and Marvin "Smitty" Smith.

== Reception ==
Professional ratings
Review scores
Source	Rating
AllMusic	3/5 stars
The Penguin Guide to Jazz Recordings	3/4 stars

The AllMusic review by Scott Yanow states: "Although not up to the level of his best live performances, this studio album is quite enjoyable and gives one a clear idea as to how Sonny Rollins sounded in the 1980s."

== Track listing ==
All compositions by Sonny Rollins except as indicated

1. "Just Once" (Barry Mann, Cynthia Weil) - 3:26
2. "O.T.Y.O.G." - 4:41
3. "Promise" - 6:29
4. "Duke of Iron" - 4:17
5. "Dancing in the Dark" (Howard Dietz, Arthur Schwartz) - 7:08
6. "I'll String Along with You" (Al Dubin, Harry Warren) - 4:44
7. "Allison" - 7:08
8. "Allison" [alternate take] - 5:32 Bonus track on CD
  - Recorded at Fantasy Studios, Berkeley, CA, on September 15–25, 1987

== Personnel ==
- Sonny Rollins – tenor saxophone
- Clifton Anderson – trombone
- Mark Soskin – piano
- Jerome Harris – electric bass, rhythm guitar
- Marvin "Smitty" Smith – drums
