= The Time of My Life: Roseanna Vitro Sings the Songs of Steve Allen =

Studio album by Roseanna Vitro
- Released: September 1999
- Recorded: July 1986; Classic Sound, New York, N.Y; Horizon Sound, N.J.
- Genre: Vocal jazz.
- Length: 46:10
- Label: Sea Breeze Records; SB-3037
- Producer: Paul Wickliffe

Roseanna Vitro chronology
Catchin’ Some Rays: The Music of Ray Charles (1997)	The Time of My Life: Roseanna Vitro Sings the Songs of Steve Allen (1999)	Conviction: Thoughts of Bill Evans (2001)

The Time of My Life: Roseanna Vitro Sings the Songs of Steve Allen is the 7th album released by jazz singer Roseanna Vitro. Recorded in 1986 under the auspices of Allen himself, it would not find a distributor until 1999, when it was released on the Sea Breeze label.

== Reception ==
Professional ratings
Review scores
Source	Rating
AllMusic	3/5 stars

Acknowledging both the timeliness of this tribute ("a deep vein of golden ore waiting to be mined") and the brilliance of its execution, AllMusic's Michael G. Nastos writes:

Enclosed in this delightful CD are many moments of brilliance in jazz and pop-oriented veins, not standard nomenclature, but modernized extensions of those traditions, sung by a vocalist who knows exactly what to do [...] Vitro's voice has never sounded better; her large emotional range, bravado, and perfectly tuned and articulated phrases are intact and served up hot and well recorded. The music itself ranges from straight jazz to pop kitsch, broken-hearted ballads and a Brazilian incursion here and there. What is most important here is that Allen's lyrics are precious, and Vitro does them proud.

== Track listing ==
All lyrics by Steve Allen; music by Allen except where indicated.

1. "The Time of My Life" - 4:37
2. "That-A-Girl" - 3:46
3. "You May Have Been Loved Before" - 3:00
4. "I Like to Dance" (Paul Smith, Steve Allen) - 3:57
5. "Emotions" - 4:52
6. "Life" - 2:38
7. "Keep Cool" - 3:42
8. "(Until I Left Chicago) I Never Had the Blues" - 4:03
9. "Convince Me" - 4:52
10. "You and I" (Miles Davis, Allen) - 2:40
11. "There's No Way Home" - 5:00
12. "Cool Yule" - 3:03

== Personnel ==
- Vocals – Roseanna Vitro – vocals
- Piano – Kenny Werner, Fred Hersch.
- Bass – Marc Johnson, Scott Lee.
- Drums – Joey Baron, Jeff Papez.
- Percussion – Cyro Baptista.
- Guitar – Scott Hardy.
- Saxophone – Billy Drewes.
