= Falling in Love with Jazz =

1989 studio album by Sonny Rollins

Studio album by Sonny Rollins
- Released: 1989
- Recorded: June 3, August 5 & September 9, 1989
- Studio: Clinton Recording Studio, New York City
- Genre: Jazz
- Length: 46:29
- Label: Milestone
- Producer: Sonny Rollins, Lucille Rollins

Sonny Rollins chronology
Dancing in the Dark (1987)	Falling in Love with Jazz (1989)	Here's to the People (1991)

Falling in Love with Jazz is a 1989 studio album by jazz saxophonist Sonny Rollins, released on the Milestone label, featuring performances by Rollins with Clifton Anderson, Bob Cranshaw, Mark Soskin, Jerome Harris and Jack DeJohnette with Branford Marsalis, Tommy Flanagan and Jeff Watts standing in on two tracks. The cover artwork was by Henri Matisse.

== Reception ==
Professional ratings
Review scores
Source	Rating
AllMusic	3/5 stars
The Penguin Guide to Jazz Recordings	3/4 stars

The AllMusic review by Scott Yanow calls the album an "average effort from Sonny Rollins and his regular sextet".

== Track listing ==
All compositions by Sonny Rollins except as indicated

1. "For All We Know" (J. Fred Coots, Sam M. Lewis) - 7:42
2. "Tennessee Waltz" (Pee Wee King, Redd Stewart) - 6:18
3. "Little Girl Blue" (Lorenz Hart, Richard Rodgers) - 7:41
4. "Falling in Love with Love" (Hart, Rodgers) - 4:49
5. "I Should Care" (Sammy Cahn, Axel Stordahl, Paul Weston) - 7:33
6. "Sister" - 7:03
7. "Amanda" - 5:47

Recorded in New York on June 3 (tracks 1 & 5), August 5 (tracks 2 & 3) and September 9 (tracks 4, 6 & 7), 1989

== Personnel ==
On tracks 1 and 5:

- Sonny Rollins - tenor saxophone
- Branford Marsalis - tenor saxophone
- Tommy Flanagan - piano
- Jerome Harris - electric bass
- Jeff Watts - drums

On all other tracks:

- Sonny Rollins - tenor saxophone
- Clifton Anderson - trombone (tracks 4, 6, and 7)
- Mark Soskin - piano
- Bob Cranshaw - electric bass
- Jerome Harris - electric guitar
- Jack DeJohnette - drums (tracks 2, 4, 6, and 7)
