= Mark Soskin =

American jazz pianist

- Born: Mark Samuel Soskin; July 12, 1953 (age 73)
- Genre: Jazz
- Occupations: Musician, music educator, clinician, arranger
- Instrument: Piano
- Years active: 1972–present
- Website: www.marksoskin.com

Mark Samuel Soskin (born 1953) is an American jazz pianist based in New York City.

== Discography ==
=== As leader ===
- Rhythm Vision (Prestige, 1980); OCLC 27058423
- Overjoyed (Jazz City, 1991); OCLC 724777884, 472123262, 658276396
- Views From Here (King, 1992); OCLC 474652801, 725181632, 470995873
- Calypso & Jazz Around the Corner (King, 1993); OCLC 724894123
- Live at Vartan Jazz (Vartan Jazz, 1996); OCLC 764636070
- Five Lands: Cinqueterra (TCB, 1998); OCLC 724867275, 605711313
- Homage To Sonny Rollins (White Foundation, (Note: The Jeremy and Kim White Foundation is a UK charity founded by Jeremy N. White and Kim Marie White; it supports the performing arts, particularly excellence in jazz, ballet, and access to ballet education for young people. In 2002, the foundation launched the Vevey Youth Ballet in Vevey, Switzerland, and the World Saxophone Competition at the Montreux Jazz Festival, which as of 2004, has been held at the London Jazz Festival. ("White Foundation World Saxophone Competition Moves to London," All About Jazz Publicity, June 67, 2004)) 2003); OCLC 474446767, 61199373
- 17 (Seventeen) (TCB, 2007); OCLC 767807850
- One Hopeful Day (Kind of Blue, 2007); (Note: Review: "Mark Soskin, One Hopeful Day," by John Fordham, The Guardian, July 6, 2007) OCLC 166904701, 482170406, 725563746
- Man Behind The Curtain (Kind of Blue, 2009); OCLC 430062953, 759886232
- Nino Rota, Piano Solo (Kind of Blue, 2012); (Note: "Best Releases of 2012," by Dan McClenaghan, All About Jazz (www.allaboutjazz.com), December 21, 2012) OCLC 768179732
- Mark Soskin Quartet, Live at Smalls (smallsLive, 2015)
- Hearts and Minds, (SteepleChase, 2017)
- Upper West Side Stories, (SteepleChase, 2018)
- Everything Old Is New Again, (SteepleChase, 2020)

=== As co-leader ===
- Spirits: with Harvie Swartz, Joe LaBarbera, Sheila Jordan, Live at Vartan Jazz, Vartan Jazz (1994); OCLC 44402050
- Contempo Trio: with Danny Gottlieb, Chip Jackson & Ravi Coltrane, No JAMF's Allowed, Jazzline (1994); OCLC 725017984, 718515858, 45266613
- Contempo Trio: with Danny Gottlieb, Chip Jackson & Carolyn Leonhart, The Secret of Life, First Media (2003); OCLC 443010908

=== As sideman ===
- Roger Glenn: Reachin', Fantasy (1976)
- Pete Escovedo and Sheila E: Solo Two, Fantasy (1976)
- Pete Escovedo and Sheila E: Happy Together, Fantasy
- Bill Summers: Feel The Heat, Fantasy
- Bill Summers: On Sunshine, Fantasy
- Bobbi Humphrey: Tailor Made, Columbia
- Billy Cobham: Magic, Columbia (1977)
- Billy Cobham: Simplicity Of Expression, Depth Of Thought, Columbia
- CBS Allstars (Billy Cobham): Alivemuthaforya, Columbia (1977); OCLC 488427009, 611504586
- George Russell: Live in an American Time Spiral, Soul Note (1982); OCLC 10544802
- Herbie Mann: Jasil Brazz, RBI (1990)
- Herbie Mann: Opalescense, Kokopelli
- Herbie Mann: Caminho de Casa, Chesky
- Herbie Mann: America/Brasil, Lightyear (1995)
- Herbie Mann: 65th Birthday Celebration, Live At The Blue Note, Lightyear (1995)
- Jeanie Stahl: I'm Just Foolin' Myself, Daring Records
- Billy Novick: Pennywhistles From Heaven, Green Linnet
- Kayoko Miyama featuring TanaReid (Note: TanaReid was the name of a quintet co-led by drummer Akira Tana (born 1952) and bassist Rufus Reid) with Mark Soskin: Best Regards, Sound Hills (1995); OCLC 81675117
- Claudio Roditi: Jazz Turns Samba, Groovin' High
- Claudio Roditi: Freewheelin', Reservoir
- Bobby Watson: Urban Renewal, Kokopelli
- Steve Bargonetti: Steve Bargonetti, Qwest (1984); OCLC 12569444
- Various Artists: A Jazz City Christmas, Jazz City (1989)
- Jimmy Ponder: Something to Ponder, Muse
- Jimmy Ponder: Steel City Soul, 32 Jazz Records
- Hendrik Muerkens: A View From Manhattan, Concord
- Hendrik Muerkens: Poema Brasilero, Concord
- Hendrik Muerkens: Slidin', Concord
- Steve Slagle featuring Joe Lovano: Smoke Signals, Panorama
- Joe Locke: Inner Space, SteepleChase (1996); OCLC 873302619
- Sonny Rollins: Don't Stop the Carnival, Milestone (1978)
- Sonny Rollins: Don't Ask Milestone (1979)
- Sonny Rollins: Sunny Days, Starry Nights, Milestone (1984)
- Sonny Rollins: Falling in Love with Jazz, Milestone (1990)
- Sonny Rollins: G-Man Milestone (1986)
- Sonny Rollins: Dancing in the Dark Milestone (1987)
- Sonny Rollins: Here's to the People Milestone (1991)
- Sonny Rollins: Silver City, Milestone (1996)
- Sonny Rollins: Road Shows, Vol.1, Doxy (2008)
- Sonny Rollins: "Road Shows, " Vol.4, Okeh ( 2016) "Holding The Stage"
- Teddy Edwards: James Van Buren Meets Teddy Edwards, Vartan Jazz
- Carla White: Live at Vartan's, Vartan Jazz
- Compilation: The Best Of Vartan Jazz, Vols. 1 & 2, Vartan Jazz
- Sherry Winston: Love Madness, Headfirst
- Sherri Roberts: Dreamsville, Brownstone
- Sherri Roberts: Twilight World, Brownstone
- Eric Wyatt: (Note: Tenor saxophonist Eric L. Wyatt (born 1961) is the son of the late tenor saxophonist Charles Wyatt, who was a childhood friend of Sonny Rollins; Rollins is Eric's godfather) God Son, Paddle Wheel (1997)
- Dawn Upshaw: The World So Wide, Nonesuch (1998)
- Ze Louis: Guaraní Banana, Malandro
- Kenia Acioly: Initial Thrill, Zebra
- Kenia Acioly: Rio/New York, Jazzmania
- Deuce: Deuce, Redwood Records (1986)
- Nanette Natal: Stairway to the Stars, Benyo Music (1990)
- Hans Kennel: "Stella," Featuring Mark Soskin, TCB
- SuperNova: SuperNova Claudia Villela, Jazzheads (1997)
- Roseanna Vitro: Conviction, A Records
- Roseanna Vitro: The Music of Randy Newman, Motema Music (2011) †
- Roseanna Vitro: Clarity: Music of Clare Fischer, Random Act Records (2014)
- Roseanna Vitro: “ Tell Me The Truth, “, Skyline (2018)
- String Of Pearls: S.O.P New York/Brasil, Alfa Music
- Bruce Williamson: Big City Magic, Timeless
- Roland Vazquez: No Separate Love, RVCD
- Roland Vazquez: Furthur Dance, RVCD
- Roland Vazquez: Quintet Live, RVCD
- Greg Abate: Happy Samba, Blue Chip Jazz
- Manhattan Reggae Unit: Come Spring, Pony Canyon
- Manhattan Reggae Unit: Together, Pony Canyon
- Fritz Renold and The Bostonian Friends: Starlight, Columbia
- The Empire State Group: Benjamin Sujesh, Anothen Records (1994)
- Kazuko Michishita: You Can Dream, Kaz Music
- Minehaha: May Happiness Be Yours, Nippon Columbia
- Various Musicians: Keys To The City, Pony Canyon
- Various Musicians: Cowboy Bebop, Victor (1998)
- Shinobu Itoh: Sailing Rolling, PAS (1991)
- Robert Debellis: Parallax, Vintone Records
- Steve Smith: Steve Smith and Buddy's Buddies: Very Live At Ronnie Scott's Jazz Club, Set 1, Tone Center (2002)
- Steve Smith: Steve Smith and Buddy's Buddies: Very Live At Ronnie Scott's Jazz Club, Set 2, Tone Center (2002)
- Steve Smith: Steve Smith's Jazz Legacy Live On Tour, Vol. 1, Drum Legacy Records
- Steve Smith: Steve Smith's Jazz Legacy Live On Tour, Vol. 2, Drum Legacy Records
- Steve Smith: Steve Smith And Vital Information NYC Edition, Viewpoint, BFM JAZZ (2015)
- Steve Smith: Steve Smith And Vital Information NYC Edition, Heart Of The City BFM JAZZ (2017)
- Danny Willensky: Back In The Mix, Speechless
- Roger Rosenberg: Baritonality, Sunnyside
- Erik Charlston – JazzBrasil: Essentially Hermeto, Sunnyside (2011)
- Eddie Allen: Push, Edjalen Music (2013)
- Denise Mangiardi: Brown Book, Alice’s Loft Music PRS/2019
- Liza Minnelli: Liza’s At The Palace, Hybrid Recordings 2008
- Kenia: On We Go, Mooka Records

Note: † signifies a Grammy nomination.

== Filmography ==
- Gato Barbieri: Live From the Latin Quarter (2001); OCLC 223766606, 48794814, 74278849
- Calle 54, Bluenote (2000)

== Notes ==
Album reviews

General references
