= Clarity: Music of Clare Fischer =

Studio album by Roseanna Vitro
- Released: 2014
- Recorded: August 26 and September 9, 2013, at Charlestown Road Studio, Hampton, N.J.
- Genre: Vocal jazz, Afro-Cuban jazz, Brazilian jazz
- Length: 56:32
- Label: Random Act Records; RAR-1016
- Producer: Paul Wickliffe

Roseanna Vitro chronology
The Music of Randy Newman (2011)	Clarity: Music of Clare Fischer (2014)

Professional ratings
Review scores
Source	Rating
All About Jazz	5/5 stars
The Buffalo News	3.5/4 stars
JazzTimes	favorable

External audio
- You may listen to "Pensativa" here

Clarity: Music of Clare Fischer is the 13th album by jazz singer Roseanna Vitro, released in 2014 by Random Act Records. The first instance of a singer releasing an album devoted to Fischer's music, Clarity unveils six new lyrics to previously instrumental compositions. One of these, "Take Your Breath and Sing" (a.k.a. "O Canto"), features the composer's son Brent Fischer on vibraphone.

== Reception ==
All About Jazz awarded the album 5 stars, with reviewer Michael C. Bailey citing Vitro's vocal prowess, arranging skills, and astute selection of material. JazzTimes' Christopher Loudon makes note of Vitro's "standout quintet" while acknowledging both the historic nature of the project ("never before has a solo vocalist paid Fischer album-length tribute") and its "magnificently thoughtful" execution.

The significance of this recording was not lost on Buffalo News music critic Jeff Simon:

This disc is as groundbreaking and as hugely valuable as her Newman adaptations were regrettable. This is what Grammys, it seems to me, ought to be for. What you have here sung by Vitro is music by Clare Fischer, a great jazz composer whose complex and difficult melodies and gorgeous songs are perfect for Vitro's abundant gifts as a jazz singer [...] What she hopes to do, she says, is introduce Fischer to the repertoire of many more jazz singers. With what she does here – along with pianist Mark Soskins [sic] and violinist Sara Caswell – she may wind up doing just that. An important disc, whether she succeeds or not.

== Track listing ==
All music composed by Clare Fischer except track #2. All other writing credits are for lyrics alone. Where no credits are given, both words and music are Fischer's.

1. "Morning" - 6:38
2. "Web of Love" ("Inquietacao") (Ary Barroso, Roger Schore) - 5:31
3. "Seagull" ("Gaviota") (Weaver Copeland) - 5:35
4. "Love's Path" ("Love's Walk") (Paul Wickliffe) - 5:19
5. "Swingin' with the Duke" (Cheryl Pyle) - 4:59
6. "Pensativa" - 6:26
7. "Life's Journey" ("Pavillion") (Cheryl Pyle) - 5:43
8. "Sleep My Child" ("Sleep Sweet Child") (Roger Schore) - 4:45
9. "Take Your Breath and Sing" ("O Canto") (Paul Wickliffe) - 5:55
10. "I Remember Spring" (Ron Boustead) (Note: As a replacement for the original "I Remember Spring" lyric (written by Les Wintz, previously recorded by Lorez Alexandria and Dianne Reeves), with which the composer had long expressed dissatisfaction, the new lyric is incorrectly credited on the CD to Fischer himself. As the composer's wife explains, "When this lyric was found, it was thought Clare had written it and it was identified as being his, but actually Ron Boustead wrote it and came forward when he heard it on Roseanna Vitro's recording in 2014. Brent is trying to get the copyright corrected to reflect the Boustead lyric and credit him for it.") - 6:00

== Personnel ==
- Vocals, arrangements – Roseanna Vitro
- Piano, arrangements – Mark Soskin
- Violin – Sara Caswell
- Bass – Dean Johnson
- Drums – Tim Horner
- Percussion – Mino Cinelu
- Vibraphone – Brent Fischer (track #9)
