= Here's to the People =

1991 studio album by Sonny Rollins

Studio album by Sonny Rollins
- Released: 1991
- Recorded: August 10, 17, 24 & 27, 1991
- Genre: Jazz
- Length: 54:03
- Label: Milestone

Sonny Rollins chronology
| Falling in Love With Jazz (1989) | Here's to the People (1991) | Old Flames (1993) |

Here's to the People is a studio album by jazz saxophonist Sonny Rollins, released on the Milestone label in 1991, featuring performances by Rollins with Clifton Anderson, Mark Soskin, Jerome Harris, Bob Cranshaw, Roy Hargrove, Jack DeJohnette, Steve Jordan, and Al Foster.

== Reception ==
Professional ratings
Review scores
| Source | Rating |
|---|---|
| AllMusic | 3/5 stars |
| The Penguin Guide to Jazz Recordings | 3/4 stars |

The AllMusic review by Scott Yanow states: "Nothing very innovative occurs but the music is quite pleasing."

== Track listing ==
All compositions by Sonny Rollins except as indicated

1. "Why Was I Born?" (Oscar Hammerstein II, Jerome Kern) - 6:36
2. "I Wish I Knew" (Mack Gordon, Harry Warren) - 7:45
3. "Here's to the People" - 7:58
4. "Doc Phil" - 5:16
5. "Someone to Watch Over Me (George Gershwin, Ira Gershwin) - 9:38
6. "Young Roy" - 6:39
7. "Lucky Day" (Ray Henderson) - 5:13
8. "Long Ago (And Far Away)" (Gershwin, Kern) - 5:34

- Recorded in NY on August 10 (tracks 3 & 7), 17 (track 4), 23 (tracks 1, 5 & 8) and 27 (tracks 2 & 6), 1991

== Personnel ==
- Sonny Rollins - tenor saxophone
- Clifton Anderson - trombone (tracks 3, 4 & 7)
- Roy Hargrove - trumpet (tracks 2 & 6)
- Mark Soskin - piano
- Jerome Harris - guitar (tracks 1, 3–5, 7 & 8)
- Bob Cranshaw - electric bass
- Jack DeJohnette - drums (tracks 1, 4, 5 & 8)
- Steve Jordan - drums (tracks 3 & 7)
- Al Foster - drums (tracks 2 & 6)
