= The Solo Album =

1985 live album by Sonny Rollins

Live album by Sonny Rollins
- Released: 1985
- Recorded: July 19, 1985
- Venues: Sculpture Garden of the Museum Of Modern Art, NYC
- Genre: Jazz
- Length: 56:10
- Label: Milestone
- Producer: Lucille Rollins

Sonny Rollins chronology
Sunny Days, Starry Nights (1984)	The Solo Album (1985)	G-Man (1986)

The Solo Album is a 1985 live album featuring a solo performance by jazz saxophonist Sonny Rollins recorded at the Sculpture Garden of the Museum of Modern Art in New York City and released on the Milestone label.

== Critical reception ==
Professional ratings
Review scores
Source	Rating
AllMusic	1/5 stars
Los Angeles Times	1/5 stars
The Penguin Guide to Jazz Recordings	2.5/4 stars

Calling it "a major disappointment" and "[o]ne of the few complete duds of Sonny Rollins' career," AllMusic reviewer Scott Yanow describes the album as a "rambling live session" that "sounds as if Rollins were merely warming up, playing whatever came into his mind without any thought of developing a coherent statement". While Yanow's retrospective view differs dramatically from the generally favorable critical reaction accorded the album's release, one contemporary reviewer, jazz historian and Los Angeles Times critic Leonard Feather, foreshadowed Yanow precisely and passionately. Stating that the album, "complete with fleeting quotes from 'Pop Goes the Weasel', 'Jim', 'Mairzy Doats' and a dozen other sources, suggests what one might hear if any Rollins-like saxophonist were caught warming up in the dressing room," Feather went further, taking some of his colleagues to task:

It is alarming that a genuine colossus of jazz, rightly hailed 25 years ago as an emperor, can remove his raiments and be seen by responsible critics as fully clothed. What is happening to critical responsibility? To Sonny Rollins? To jazz? One star.

Feather was not entirely alone; High Fidelity cited "Rollins' obvious discomfort and nervous flitting about," which "ultimately grinds The Solo Album down to the level of a hip parlor game." Still, theirs was decidedly the minority view. The New York Times critic Jon Pareles, writing shortly after the album's release, described it as "one of Mr. Rollins's most illuminating albums", adding that it "may be as close as we can get to a great jazz musician's stream of consciousness." Others sounded a similar theme, including Saturday Review's John Swenson, who described the album as "nearly an hour [of] Rollins develop[ing] stunning solo ideas that rank with some of the best playing of his career," The Providence Journal's Jim MacNie, who called it "an amazing tour de force," and The Boston Phoenix, which named it one of the top 10 jazz albums of 1985.

The reviewer for The Saxophone Symposium, a periodical of the North American Saxophone Alliance, described his "considerable time spent" with Rollins' album as "[p]robably one of my most intense recent listening experiences," while Musician's Chip Stern called the album "a wondrous thing, like the peak of some inscrutable mountain parting through the clouds for the first time," noting its emphasis of "melodic rhythmic development over the harmonic," and ascribing to Rollins' improvisation "a stately thematic inevitability that would do Mozart proud."

== Track listing ==
All compositions by Sonny Rollins.

1. "Soloscope, Part 1" – 28:15
2. "Soloscope, Part 2" – 27:55

== Personnel ==
- Sonny Rollins – tenor saxophone
