= Listen Here (Roseanna Vitro album) =

Studio album by Roseanna Vitro
- Released: 1984
- Recorded: October 4, 1982
- Genre: Vocal jazz
- Label: Texas Rose; TRM-1001
- Producer: Paul Wickliffe

Roseanna Vitro chronology
Listen Here (1984)	A Quiet Place (1987)

Listen Here is the first album by jazz singer Roseanna Vitro, recorded in October 1982 and released in 1984 on the Texas Rose label.

== Reception ==
Professional ratings
Review scores
Source	Rating
AllMusic	3/5 stars

AllMusic awarded Vitro's debut LP three stars out of a possible 5, with reviewer Alex Henderson describing it as both "enjoyable and historically important," noting the "considerable promise" exhibited by the young Vitro, both "as a scat singer and [an] interpreter of lyrics." In addition, Henderson cited the "hard-swinging accompaniment [of] pianist Kenny Barron, bassist Buster Williams, drummer Ben Riley and the late Texas tenor sax hero Arnett Cobb."

== Track listing ==
1. "No More Blues (Chega de Saudade)" (Antonio Carlos Jobim, Vinícius de Moraes, Jon Hendricks)
2. "You Go to My Head" (J. Fred Coots, Haven Gillespie)
3. "Centerpiece" (Harry Edison, Jon Hendricks)
4. "Love You Madly" (Duke Ellington)
5. "A Time for Love" (Johnny Mandel, Paul Francis Webster)
6. "This Happy Madness (Estrada Branca)" (Antonio Carlos Jobim, Vinicius de Moraes, Gene Lees)
7. "Listen Here" (Eddie Harris)
8. "It Could Happen to You" (Jimmy Van Heusen, Johnny Burke)
9. "Easy Street" (Charles Strouse, Martin Charnin)
10. "Sometime Ago" (Sergio Mihanovich)
11. "You Took Advantage of Me" (Richard Rodgers, Lorenz Hart)
12. "Black Coffee" (Sonny Burke, Paul Francis Webster)

== Personnel ==
- Vocals – Roseanna Vitro
- Piano – Kenny Barron, Bliss Rodriguez (on "Centerpiece" only)
- Bass – Buster Williams
- Drums – Ben Riley
- Tenor Saxophone – Arnett Cobb
- Guitar – Scott Hardy
- Percussion – Duduka Da Fonseca
