= A Quiet Place (album) =

Studio album by Roseanna Vitro
- Released: October 1987
- Genre: Vocal jazz
- Length: 40:10
- Label: Skyline; SKYD – 8701
- Producer: Paul Wickliffe

Roseanna Vitro chronology
Listen Here (1985)	A Quiet Place (1987)	Reaching for the Moon (1991)

Professional ratings
Review scores
Source	Rating
AllMusic	2/5 stars
The Baltimore Sun	4/5 stars

A Quiet Place is the second album by jazz singer Roseanna Vitro, released in October 1987 on the Skyline label.

== Reception ==
AllMusic awarded the album 2 stars, with reviewer Scott Yanow citing its uncharacteristic attempt at crossover appeal:

[A]lthough she does a fine job with Chick Corea's "Times Lie," not much can be done with tunes by Lionel Richie and Patrice Rushen. Despite the presence of Eddie Daniels (mostly on tenor) and keyboardist Fred Hersch, this is a surprisingly forgettable effort by a talented singer.

By contrast, a contemporaneous review by The Baltimore Sun awarded four stars, with critic Kelly Gilbert singling out both the Lionel Richie cover and Vitro's vocal attributes for praise, along with four of the album's six original compositions (including three featuring lyrics written by Vitro):

In a word, Vitro and this album are dynamite. [... Her] chief characteristic is a silky-smooth voice that is equally at home with slow and thoughtful songs, fast-paced belters and most anything in between. Vitro co-wrote four of the songs here, three of them – including the jazzy title cut – with Fred Hersch. [...] "A Quiet Place," What Are We Gonna Do," "Every Time You're Near Me" and "Mirage" are standouts, and Vitro injects new emotion into Lionel Richie's "Hello" by slowing the tempo.

== Track listing ==
All composer credits and durations derived from The Record Room.

1. "A Quiet Place" (Fred Hersch, Roseanna Vitro) – 3:58
2. "What Are We Gonna Do?" (Hersch, Vitro) – 4:10
3. "Hello" (Lionel Richie) – 5:45
4. "Every Time You're Near Me" (Steve Sacks, Vitro) – 3:02
5. "Times Lie" (Chick Corea, Bobbie Bryan) – 4:34
6. "Strange Situation" (Hersch, Vitro) – 3:33
7. "You Love Me Only" (Patrice Rushen) – 5:08
8. "A Simple Samba" (Hersch, Cheryl Pyle) – 4:07
9. "Mirage" (Hersch, Pyle) – 5:53

== Personnel ==
All information derived from RoseannaVitro.com.

- Vocals – Roseanna Vitro
- Keyboards – Fred Hersch
- Bass – Mark Egan
- Drums – Joey Baron
- Tenor Saxophone and Flute – Eddie Daniels
- Guitar – Jay Azzolina
- Percussion – Cyro Baptista
- Background vocals – Daryl Tookes, Angela Clemmon, Patrick Vitro, Roseanna Vitro
