= The Hissing of Summer Lawns =

Studio album by Joni Mitchell
- Released: November 17, 1975
- Recorded: 1975
- Studio: A&M (Hollywood)
- Genres: Soft rock; jazz pop; art rock; folk jazz; avant-pop
- Length: 42:26
- Label: Asylum
- Producer: Joni Mitchell

Joni Mitchell chronology
| Miles of Aisles (1974) | The Hissing of Summer Lawns (1975) | Hejira (1976) |

Singles from The Hissing of Summer Lawns
- 1. "In France They Kiss on Main Street" Released: January 1976

The Hissing of Summer Lawns is the seventh studio album by the Canadian singer-songwriter Joni Mitchell, released in November 1975 on Asylum Records. It continues the jazz-rock influence of Mitchell's previous album, Court and Spark, with more unconventional and experimental material. It features backing from members of jazz-rock groups L.A. Express and The Crusaders, with additional contributions from James Taylor, David Crosby, and Graham Nash. It also introduced synthesizers (Moog and ARP) to Mitchell's work for the first time, as well as experimenting with sampling.

The lyrics focus on women's experiences with patriarchal norms, male dominance, and suburban life, as well as on culture and the music industry. As with many of her albums, Mitchell created the cover art. It depicts a painting of a group of men carrying a large snake superimposed over the Beverly Hills suburbs; Mitchell's house is shaded in blue.

While it did not spawn a major hit single like its predecessor, The Hissing of Summer Lawns reached number 4 in the US and remains Mitchell's last top-10 album. "In France They Kiss on Main Street", the only single, reached number 66 on the Billboard Hot 100.

The Hissing of Summer Lawns initially received negative reviews, with critics finding the jazz stylings a disservice to Mitchell's lyrics and comparing it negatively to Court and Spark. However, it later became one of her most acclaimed works. It appeared at number 258 in Rolling Stone's 2020 edition of its list of the 500 greatest albums of all time, and at number 217 in the third edition of Colin Larkin's All Time Top 1000 Albums in 2000.

== Background ==
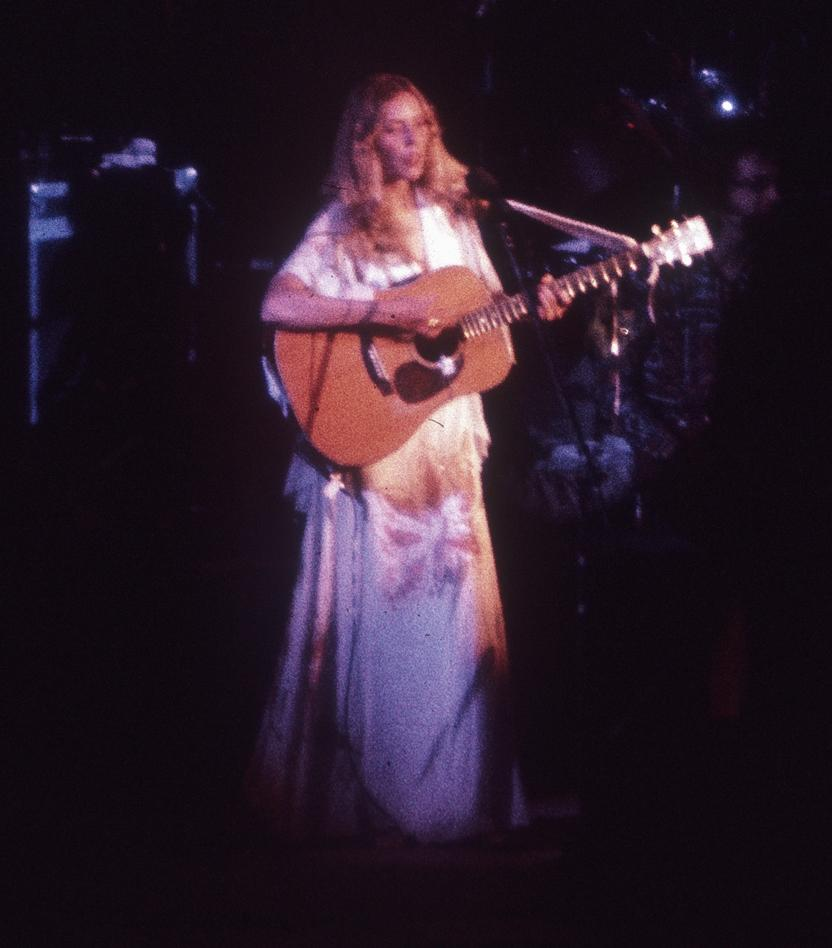
Mitchell in 1974

The slick jazz-pop sound Mitchell developed on Court and Spark (1974) would be pushed into more adventurous territory on The Hissing of Summer Lawns. Some tracks reflect a fusion of jazz and "shimmering avant-pop". The album also features an ARP synthesizer and African drums.

On "The Jungle Line", Mitchell is credited with the first commercially released song to include a sample, featuring a looped recording of percussion by the African ensemble The Drummers of Burundi. This interest in world music presaged the work of Peter Gabriel and Paul Simon in subsequent years. In a 1983 interview for Musician Magazine Mitchell was asked what prompted her to use the drums. Mitchell explained: "Because I loved that Burundi warriors passage. It had a Bo Diddley lick in it which I took out and made into a loop and then ran this black cultural poem under it. I thought I was black for about three years. I felt like there was a black poet trapped inside me, and that song was about Harlem—the primitive juxtaposed against the Frankenstein of modern industrialization; the wheels turning and the gears grinding and the beboppers with the junky spit running down their trumpets. All of that together with that Burundi tribal thing was perfect. But people just thought it was weird."

== Songs ==
The first track, "In France They Kiss on Main Street", is a jazz-rock song about coming of age in a small town in the 1950s rock & roll era. (The song was released as the single from the album and reached number 66 on the Billboard charts.) "The Jungle Line" uses a field recording from Africa of the Drummers of Burundi (called 'warrior drums' in the credits), onto which are dubbed guitar, Moog synthesizer and the vocal line. The lyrics pay homage to the works of the French Post-Impressionist painter Henri Rousseau. Mitchell blends details of his works with imagery of modern city life, the music industry and the underground drug culture.

"Edith and the Kingpin" marks a return to jazz in a story of a gangster's new moll arriving in his home town. "Don't Interrupt the Sorrow" is an acoustic guitar-based song with stream-of-consciousness lyrics, focused on women standing up to male dominance and proclaiming their own existence as individuals. "Shades of Scarlett Conquering" is an orchestral-based piece about a modern southern belle basing her life and self-image on the stereotypes of the Scarlett O'Hara character from Gone with the Wind.

The second side begins with the title track, "The Hissing of Summer Lawns", which is about a woman who chooses to stay in a marriage where she is treated as part of her husband's portfolio. "The Boho Dance" comments on people who feel that artists betray their artistic integrity for commercial success, with an ironic glance at those who said this of Mitchell herself and parallels Tom Wolfe's The Painted Word. "Harry's House / Centerpiece" concerns failing marriage as example of the loneliness of modern life and frames the jazz standard "Centerpiece" by Harry "Sweets" Edison and Jon Hendricks. "Sweet Bird" is a sparser acoustic track that is a slight return to Mitchell's so-called 'confessional' singer-songwriter style and addresses the loss of beauty power with ageing. Its lyrics indicate that it may also be a reference to Tennessee Williams's Sweet Bird of Youth. The final track is "Shadows and Light", consisting of many overdubs of her voice and an ARP String Machine (credited as an ARP-Farfisa on the album sleeve).

The African theme of "The Jungle Line" also features on the album sleeve, with an image of dark-skinned people carrying a large snake (both were embossed on the original vinyl album cover). Mitchell's own house is marked in blue on the right side of the front cover.

== Reception ==
Professional ratings
Review scores
| Source | Rating |
|---|---|
| AllMusic | 4.5/5 stars |
| Christgau's Record Guide | B |
| The Encyclopedia of Popular Music | 5/5 stars |
| MusicHound | 4/5 stars |
| Pitchfork | 10/10 |
| Rolling Stone | (mixed) |
| The Rolling Stone Album Guide | 3.5/5 stars |
| Sounds | 5/5 stars |
| Martin C. Strong | 8/10 |
| Uncut | 9/10 |

The album initially received harsh criticism. In Rolling Stone, Stephen Holden wrote that the album's lyrics were impressive but the music was a failure. "If The Hissing of Summer Lawns offers substantial literature, it is set to insubstantial music... Four members of Tom Scott's L.A. Express are featured on Hissing, but their uninspired jazz-rock style completely opposes Mitchell's romantic style... The Hissing of Summer Lawns is ultimately a great collection of pop poems with a distracting soundtrack. Read it first. Then play it." Critic Robert Christgau called the musical accompaniment "the most ambitious of her career," but criticized Mitchell's choice of session musicians and opined that "only on a couple of cuts — 'The Jungle Line' and 'Don't Interrupt the Sorrow' — do these skillful sound effects strengthen the lyrics. The result is that Mitchell's words must stand pretty much on their own."

The record's reputation has grown in stature over the years. Music writer Howard Sounes has called The Hissing of Summer Lawns Mitchell's masterpiece, "an LP to stand alongside Blood on the Tracks". Prince, a lifelong fan of Mitchell, praised the album. In a 1985 interview with Rolling Stone, when asked which recent recording he had enjoyed, Prince described Summer Lawns as "the last album I loved all the way through." Critic Jessica Hopper of Pitchfork noted the album was originally felt as a betrayal by some listeners, but stated that while "it doesn't have the rhapsodic rep as Blue, it's unquestionably one of Mitchell's finest albums, and it is certainly her most timeless."

=== Accolades ===
In 1977, at the 19th Grammy Awards, Mitchell was nominated for the Grammy Award for Best Female Pop Vocal Performance for the album.

It was voted number 217 in the third edition of Colin Larkin's All Time Top 1000 Albums (2000). The album was included in Robert Dimery's 1001 Albums You Must Hear Before You Die. in 2020, Rolling Stone ranked the album at number 258 in the 2020 edition of its 500 greatest albums of all time.

== Track listing ==
All tracks are written by Joni Mitchell, except where noted.

Side one
| No. | Title | Length |
|---|---|---|
| 1. | "In France They Kiss on Main Street" | 3:17 |
| 2. | "The Jungle Line" | 4:20 |
| 3. | "Edith and the Kingpin" | 3:35 |
| 4. | "Don't Interrupt the Sorrow" | 4:04 |
| 5. | "Shades of Scarlett Conquering" | 4:57 |
| Total length: | | 20:13 |

Side two
| No. | Title | Writer(s) | Length |
|---|---|---|---|
| 1. | "The Hissing of Summer Lawns" | Mitchell; John Guerin | 3:00 |
| 2. | "The Boho Dance" | | 3:56 |
| 3. | "Harry's House/Centerpiece" | Mitchell / Jon Hendricks; Harry Edison | 6:52 |
| 4. | "Sweet Bird" | | 4:10 |
| 5. | "Shadows and Light" | | 4:15 |
| Total length: | | | 22:13 |

== Personnel ==
Track numbering refers to CD and digital releases of the album.

=== Musicians ===
- Joni Mitchell – vocals, acoustic guitar (tracks 1–4, 9), Moog (2), piano (5, 9), keyboards (7), ARP and Farfisa (10)
- Victor Feldman – electric piano (1, 5), congas (4), vibes (5), keyboards and percussion (6)
- Joe Sample – electric piano (3), keyboards (8)
- Larry Carlton – electric guitar (3–5, 9)
- Robben Ford – electric guitar (1), Dobro (4), guitar (8)
- Jeff Baxter – electric guitar (1)
- James Taylor – background vocals (1), guitar (6)
- David Crosby and Graham Nash – background vocals (1)
- Max Bennett – bass guitar (1, 5–8)
- Wilton Felder – bass guitar (3, 4)
- John Guerin – drums (except 2), Moog and arrangement (6)
- The Warrior Drums of Burundi (2)
- Chuck Findley – horn (3), trumpet (6, 8), flugelhorn (7)
- Bud Shank – saxophone and flute (3, 6), bass flute (7)
- Dale Oehler – string arrangement (5)

=== Technical ===
- Joni Mitchell – producer, cover design, illustration
- Henry Lewy – engineer, mix with Mitchell
- Ellis Sorkin – assistant engineer
- Bernie Grundman – mastering
- Joe Gastwirt – re-mastered at Ocean View Digital Mastering in Los Angeles for 1997 HDCD release
- Norman Seeff – photography

== Charts ==
=== Weekly charts ===
Weekly chart performance for The Hissing of Summer Lawns
| Chart (1975–1976) | Peak position |
|---|---|
| Australian Albums (Kent Music Report) | 62 |
| Canada Top Albums/CDs (RPM) | 7 |
| UK Albums (Official Charts) | 14 |
| US Billboard 200 | 4 |
| US Cash Box Top 100 Albums | 5 |

Weekly chart performance for The Hissing of Summer Lawns Vinyl Reissue
| Chart (2024) | Peak position |
|---|---|
| US Top Album Sales (Billboard) | 19 |
| US Vinyl Albums (Billboard) | 6 |

=== Year-end charts ===
Year-end chart performance for The Hissing of Summer Lawns
| Chart (1976) | Position |
|---|---|
| Canada (RPM) | 58 |

== Certifications ==
| Region | Certification | Certified units/sales |
|---|---|---|
| United States (RIAA) | Gold | 500,000^{^} |
^{^} Shipments figures based on certification alone.
