= Catchin' Some Rays: The Music of Ray Charles =

Studio album by Roseanna Vitro
- Released: August 1997
- Recorded: March 26, 1997 at Sound on Sound, NYC; April 4, 1997 at Quad Recording Studios, NYC
- Genre: Vocal jazz
- Length: 61:00
- Label: Telarc Jazz; CD-83419
- Producer: Paul Wickliffe

Roseanna Vitro chronology
| Passion Dance (1996) | Catchin' Some Rays: The Music of Ray Charles (1997) | The Time of My Life: Roseanna Vitro Sings the Songs of Steve Allen (1999) |

Professional ratings
Review scores
| Source | Rating |
|---|---|
| AllMusic | 3/5 stars |
| The Washington Post | favorable |

Catchin' Some Rays: The Music of Ray Charles is the 6th album by jazz singer Roseanna Vitro, released in August 1997 on the Telarc Jazz label.

== Reception ==
AllMusic awarded the album 3 stars, with reviewer Scott Yanow citing a "highly enjoyable" and "continually interesting set," itself benefitting from the singer's talent, versatility, and juducious avoidance of Charles' most over-exposed vehicles, as well as from contributions by "pianist Ken Werner (who duets with the singer on a medley of "You Don't Know Me" and "Ruby"), trumpeter Eddie Henderson, and tenorman [and Ray Charles alumnus] David "Fathead" Newman."

A contemporaneous review by The Washington Post music critic Geoffrey Himes notes two tactics employed by both Vitro and, before that, Shirley Horn in her own Ray Charles tribute album, Light Out of Darkness: namely, a "more elastic sense of swing" to "replace [Charles'] pounding R&B rhythms," and an emphasis on "the sound of the vocals and the detours they take":

Vitro gives every song either a finger-snapping swing arrangement or a swooning cabaret ballad setting. Over the throbbing pulse established by acoustic bassists Ray Drummond and Ed Howard, Vitro adds her smart, sultry vocals. She sticks close to the original melody on the first verse and chorus, but then starts slipping and sliding out of the original pathway to add her own twists on the tunes. When she shifts into Charles' trademark soulful, bluesy purr, she does it so naturally and convincingly that she sounds right at home with Charles' longtime tenor saxophonist David "Fathead" Newman.

== Track listing ==
1. "Unchain My Heart" (Ray Charles) – 5:27
2. "Don't Let the Sun Catch You Crying" (Joe Greene) – 5:20
3. "One Mint Julep" (Rudy Toombs) – 4:40
4. "Night Time Is the Right Time" (Ozzie Cadena, Lew Herman); "But On the Other Hand Baby" (Ray Charles, Percy Mayfield) – 6:28
5. "Them That's Got" (Ray Charles) – 6:16
6. "I Don't Need No Doctor" (Nicholas Ashford, Valerie Simpson, Josie Armstead) – 4:41
7. "Tell Me You'll Wait for Me" (Charles Brown, Oscar Moore) – 5:13
8. "Sticks and Stones" (Titus Turner) – 4:07
9. "The Danger Zone" (Percy Mayfield) – 5:23
10. "Roll With My Baby" (Sam Sweet) – 3:02
11. "Lonely Avenue" (Doc Pomus) – 3:43
12. "You Don't Know Me" (Eddy Arnold)/"Ruby" (Heinz Eric Roemheld) – 6:22

== Personnel ==
- Vocals – Roseanna Vitro
- Trumpets – Eddie Henderson, Dave Ballou
- Alto saxophone – Ed Joffe
- Tenor saxophone – David "Fathead" Newman
- Baritone saxophone – Gary Smulyan
- Piano, arrangements – Kenny Werner
- Guitar – Chieli Minucci, Mitch Stein
- Bass – Ray Drummond, Ed Howard
- Drums – Al Foster
- Percussion and Flute – Mark Johnson
