= Sunny Days, Starry Nights =

1984 studio album by Sonny Rollins

Studio album by Sonny Rollins
- Released: 1984
- Recorded: January 23–27, 1984
- Studio: Fantasy Studios, Berkeley, CA
- Genre: Jazz
- Length: 38:57
- Label: Milestone
- Producer: Lucille Rollins

Sonny Rollins chronology
| Reel Life (1982) | Sunny Days, Starry Nights (1984) | The Solo Album (1985) |

Sunny Days, Starry Nights is a 1984 studio album by jazz saxophonist Sonny Rollins, released on the Milestone label, featuring performances by Rollins with Clifton Anderson, Mark Soskin, Russell Blake and Tommy Campbell.

== Reception ==
Professional ratings
Review scores
| Source | Rating |
|---|---|
| AllMusic | 2.5/5 stars |
| Robert Christgau | A |
| The Penguin Guide to Jazz Recordings | 3/4 stars |
| The Rolling Stone Album Guide | 4.5/5 stars |
| The Rolling Stone Jazz Record Guide | 4/5 stars |

The AllMusic review by Scott Yanow states: "Sunny Days, Starry Nights as usual finds the great tenor at his best on the two ballads ('I'm Old Fashioned' and Noel Coward's 'I'll See You Again') while the other four originals have been largely forgotten." Music critic Robert Christgau called the album "his most accessible and uncompromised album in more than a decade is soaked in the swinging pan-Caribbean 'calypso' that's been his special pleasure since the '50s..."

== Track listing ==
All compositions by Sonny Rollins except where noted.

1. "Mava Mava" – 4:34
2. "I'm Old Fashioned" (Jerome Kern, Johnny Mercer) – 6:28
3. "Wynton" – 8:20
4. "Tell Me You Love Me" – 6:16
5. "I'll See You Again" (Noël Coward) – 6:21
6. "Kilauea" – 6:59

== Personnel ==
- Sonny Rollins – tenor saxophone
- Clifton Anderson – trombone
- Mark Soskin – piano, electric piano, celesta, synthesizer
- Russell Blake – electric bass
- Tommy Campbell – drums
- Lucille Rollins – cowbell (tracks 1, 6)
