= Roland Vazquez =

- Born: July 4, 1951 (age 74); Pasadena, California, U.S.
- Genres: Jazz, Afro-Latin jazz, Latin jazz
- Occupations: Composer, drummer, educator
- Instrument: Drums
- Years active: 1970s–present
- Labels: Arista/GRP, independent

Roland Vazquez (born July 4, 1951) is a mixed-heritage Chicano/Native American composer, drummer, band leader, producer, and educator. His music combines Afro and Indigenous rhythms with American Jazz and Western classical music elements in his works for quintet, nonet, percussion ensemble, and big band.

== Early life and education ==
Vazquez was born in Pasadena, California. He began playing drums in the 1960s and performed with R&B and rock groups around Los Angeles. He later studied at Westminster College and earned a Master of Music degree from the Manhattan School of Music, joining that Jazz Faculty in 1988. He is the nephew of the late activist and author Richard Vasquez, bestselling author of Chicano.

== Career ==
In 1977, Vazquez received a Jazz Performance Grant from the National Endowment for the Arts, which supported his recording Urban Ensemble – The Music of Roland Vazquez (1979). Billboard Magazine called the album "funky-salsa-bebop ... a decade ahead of its time." From 1978 to 1981, he was a core member of Clare Fischer’s group Salsa Picante, appearing on the Grammy-winning album Salsa Picante 2+2. In 2009, The Aaron Copland Fund for Music, Inc. awarded Roland Music RVCD (Red Hook, NY) a grant to record The Visitor as part of their "New American Recording Projects."

Roland Vazquez has performed at many clubs and festivals, including: In the Los Angeles area: The Baked Potato, Concerts By The Sea, John Anson Ford Amphitheatre, Lighthouse Café, Santa Monica Civic Auditorium; In the New York area: Birdland (New York jazz club), The Bottom Line (venue), Mikell's, The Falcon, Seventh Avenue South (jazz club), Village Gate; And festivals: Big Rock Jazz Festival KY, Edmonton International Jazz Festival, Flint Jazz Festival MI, Montreal International Jazz Festival, Vancouver International Jazz Festival.

He has released several albums as artist producer, including Feel Your Dream (1982), The Tides of Time (1988), No Separate Love (1991), Further Dance (1997), Quintet Live (2007) and The Visitor (2010). His compositions have been performed and recorded by ensembles and jazz orchestras around the world. He has performed and toured mostly with his octet and quintet (1975-2015), occasionally also leading his own big band. Many jazz luminaries have recorded with him such as Anthony Jackson, Walt Weiskopf, Patrice Rushen, Bennie Maupin, Mark Soskin, Alex Acuña, Clare Fischer, Shirley Walker, Dick Oatts, Brian Lynch (musician), Nathan East, Luis Conte, MikeStern, Samuel Torres, Abe Laboriel, and Steve Tavaglione.

Vazquez has been commissioned to compose for chamber and orchestral ensembles, including Ghost in the Mountain (2000) and chamber percussion pieces for Christopher Lamb. Vazquez arranged the horns on Peter Cetera's self-titled 1981 debut album; and Whitren & Cartwright’s Rhythm Hymn (1981) for producer Phil Ramone.

=== Teaching career ===
Vazquez taught at the Manhattan School of Music from 1988 to 1999, where he directed Jazz Combos and founded the Latin Jazz Big Band. From 2000 to 2005, he was a faculty member at the University of Michigan, taught the Jazz Composition class sequence, Music of the Afro Latin Diaspora (American Culture/Ethnic studies), while directing jazz combos, the 40 piece avant garde improviser’s ensemble (ICE) and an Afro-Latin Jazz ensemble. He is currently teaching as a Visiting Artist at Bard College (since 2019), where he has developed a two semester lecture course Music of the Black Atlantic, the Afro Caribbean Percussion Ensemble, and the Afro Caribbean Jazz Ensemble. In 2024, he presented as a Guest Lecturer "The Drum: Universal Mirror, Universal Body-clock" at the Bard Prison Initiative /Fishkill Facility.

He was a visiting artist at the American Academy in Rome (2005-06), where he composed new works and performed with various Italian and touring U.S. jazz artists.

Vazquez has presented many performance/lecture clinics while in residency at colleges, universities, and conservatories around the world, perhaps most notably: Eastman School of Music, Berklee School of Music, University of Cincinnati College Conservatory, University of Wisconsin, Hartt School of Music, Ohio University, University of Michigan, William Patterson, Georgetown University, Montclair State University, Queens College (NY), PASIC (2003), Espoo Jazz Festival (Finland), Canadian Jazz Festival (Vancouver & Victoria).

== Reception ==
Vazquez’s recordings have been covered by jazz publications such as DownBeat and JazzTimes. Specifically, Further Dance and The Visitor have been acclaimed by several publications; respectively, Further Dance for its original compositions and multi-genre hybridization, and The Visitor for its musicianship.

== Selected discography ==
- In the Life Before (Korman Records, 1978)
- Urantia (PBR International, 1978)
- Urban Ensemble – The Music of Roland Vazquez (Arista/GRP, 1979)
- Feel Your Dream (Headfirst/MCA, 1982)
- The Tides of Time (Soundwings/Welk Group, 1988)
- No Separate Love (RVCD, 1991)
- Best of the LA Jazz Ensemble (RVCD, 1994)
- Further Dance (RVCD, 1997)
- Quintet Live (RVCD, 2007)
- The Visitor (RVCD, 2010)

== As contributor ==
- Clare Fischer & Salsa Picante - 2+2 (album) (Pausa Records, 1981) Drums
- Peter Cetera - Peter Cetera (album) (Full Moon / Warner Bros, 1981) Horns Arranger
- Whiten & Cartwright - Rhythm Hymn (Elektra Records, 1982) Percussion, Horns Arranger
- Naoya Matsuoka - Fall On The Avenue (Nippon Phonogram, 1982) Drums
- Luis Conte - La Cocina Caliente (Denon, 1988) Drums, Composer
- Rob Prester - Trillium (Antilles New Directions, 1988) Drums, Producer
- Phil Upchurch – Tell The Truth (Evidence, 2001) Composer: Long Gone Bird
- Afro Bop Alliance Big Band - Revelation (OA2 Records, 2014) Composer, Conductor
- Triospeak – Triospeak Volume One (2015) Drums
- Triospeak – Triospeak 2 (2024) Drums
