= Reaching for the Moon (album) =

Studio album by Roseanna Vitro
- Released: June 1991
- Recorded: Skyline, New York City
- Genre: Vocal jazz, Brazilian jazz
- Length: 57:22
- Label: Chase Music Group; CMD 8030
- Producer: Paul Wickliffe

Roseanna Vitro chronology
| A Quiet Place (1987) | Reaching for the Moon (1991) | Softly (1994) |

Professional ratings
Review scores
| Source | Rating |
|---|---|
| AllMusic | 2.5/5 stars |
| CD Review | favorable |
| JazzTimes | favorable |
| Los Angeles Times | 3/5 stars |

External audio
- You may listen to "You Are There" here

Reaching for the Moon is the third album by jazz singer Roseanna Vitro, released in 1991 on the CMG label. Vitro explores a number of genres, accompanied by pianist-arranger Kenny Werner and a varying cast of featured and supporting players, including saxophonists George Coleman, Joe Lovano and Kirk Whalum, drummer Tom Rainey, bassists Harvie Swartz and Ratzo Harris, and percussionists Mino Cinelu, Steve Berrios and Café.

== Reception ==
AllMusic's retrospective review awards the album 2½ stars out of 5. While acknowledging Kenny Werner as "an under-appreciated pianist" and affirming that Vitro herself "is in good voice throughout," reviewer Ken Dryden portrays the album as a less than ideal showcase for their talents, citing both the "strange engineering" of vocals (causing "a slow fade which proves to be very distracting") and a perceived over-reliance on "bland synthesizer" on many tracks.

By contrast, contemporaneous reviews by JazzTimes and CD Review were uniformly positive. The latter judged Vitro's attempt to emotionally engage her listener a "Bullseye," citing both "the supple power of her phrasing" and her voice's "sensual[ity] and intens[ity]," while JazzTimes proclaimed:

Roseanna Vitro does reach for the moon, and yanks the brass ring. Vitro introduces us to new tunes, sings deeply in many styles, scats refreshingly, and works with mobile combos under the aegis of agile pianist/arranger Kenny Werner. Vitro is full-voiced, good spirited, and abrim with a yearning grace.

Commending Vitro's relatively straightforward delivery (in contrast to a previously detected tendency towards sometimes distracting vocal flourishes), Los Angeles Times critic Zan Stewart also made note of the singer's "impressive Brazilian feel," as well as "Kenny Werner's ace accompaniment" and "vital saxophone solos from George Coleman and Joe Lovano."

== Track listing ==
1. "I Bet You Thought I'd Never Find You" (Les McCann, Jon Hendricks) - 6:09
2. "In a Sentimental Mood" (Duke Ellington, Irving Mills, Manny Kurtz) - 6:37
3. "Canção do Sal" (a.k.a. "Song of Salt") (Milton Nascimento) - 5:44
4. "Reaching for the Moon" (Irving Berlin) - 5:08
5. "In the Name of Love" (Kenny Rankin, Estelle Levitt) - 4:14
6. "The Island" (Ivan Lins, Alan and Marilyn Bergman) - 5:56
7. "You Are There" (Johnny Mandel, Dave Frishberg) - 5:48
8. "Gathering Stones" (Kenny Werner) - 5:57
9. "Yesterdays" (Jerome Kern, Otto Harbach) - 5:30
10. "Slow Hot Wind" (Henry Mancini, Norman Gimbel) - 6:19

== Personnel ==
All information derived from Jazz Music Archives.

- Vocals – Roseanna Vitro
- Piano, synthesizers, arrangements – Kenny Werner
- Bass – Scott Lee, Harvie Swartz, Ratzo Harris
- Drums – Tom Rainey, Victor Jones, Jeff Papez
- Tenor Saxophone – Joe Lovano, Kirk Whalum, George Coleman, Mel Ellison
- Percussion – Edson "Café" A. da Silva, Mino Cinelu, Steve Berrios
- Guitar – Celso Mendez, Scott Hardy
- Additional vocals – Eric Troyer
