= Clifton Anderson =

American jazz trombonist (born 1957)

- Born: October 5, 1957 (age 67); New York City
- Genres: Jazz
- Occupation: Musician
- Instrument: Trombone
- Years active: 1970s–present
- Labels: Milestone
- Website: cliftonanderson.biz

Clifton Elliot Anderson (born October 5, 1957) is an American jazz trombonist.

== Early life ==
Anderson was born in New York City on October 5, 1957. "His mother was a singer and his father was an organist." When he was seven, Anderson's uncle, saxophonist Sonny Rollins, bought him his first trombone. Anderson attended the High School of Music and Art in New York, and graduated from the Manhattan School of Music in 1978.

== Later life and career ==
Anderson joined Rollins's band in 1983. Other bands he has played in include Frank Foster's Loud Minority, Carlos Garnett's Cosmos Nucleus, Slide Hampton's World of Trombones, and McCoy Tyner's big band. Anderson's debut album as a leader was Landmarks, which was recorded in 1995 for Milestone Records. A further album, Decade, was released by Doxy around 2008. Anderson explained the difficulties he had between recordings: "Landmarks was played fairly regularly on the radio and the critics thought it was good, so I assumed I'd be able to get a gig. But [...] I was offered jobs for such bad money that I couldn't accept, if only because I wanted to be able to pay my sidemen something."

Anderson's third album as leader was And So We Carry On, from around 2013.

The trombone player's most recent album is Been Down This Road Before from 2020, featuring vocalist Andy Bey and musicians Renee McLean, Antoine Roney, Eric Wyatt, Peter Bernstein, John F. Adams, Monty Alexander, Stephen Scott, Tadataka Unno, Buster Williams, Tom Barney, Ronnie Burrage, Al Foster, Steve Jordan, Sammy Figueroa, and Victor See Yuen.

== Playing style ==
"Anderson plays with an assured, full tone, and draws from the style of Curtis Fuller, although he also employs pre-bop devices, such as slides and smears."

== Discography ==
=== As leader ===
- Landmarks (Milestone, 1995)
- Decade (Universal/Doxy, 2008)
- And So We Carry On (Daywood Drive, 2011)
- Been Down This Road Before (BSMF, 2020)

=== As sideman ===
With Muhal Richard Abrams

- The Hearinga Suite (Black Saint, 1989)

With Geri Allen

- The Life of a Song (Telarc, 2004)

With Lester Bowie

- Live at the 6th Tokyo Music Joy (DIW, 1990)

With Robin Eubanks

- Different Perspectives (JMT, 1989) – recorded in 1988

With Sonny Rollins

- Sunny Days, Starry Nights (Milestone, 1984)
- G-Man (Milestone, 1987) – recorded in 1986
- Dancing in the Dark (Milestone, 1987)
- Falling in Love with Jazz (Milestone, 1989)
- Here's to the People (Milestone, 1991)
- Global Warming (Milestone, 1998)
- This Is What I Do (Milestone, 2000)
- Without a Song: The 9/11 Concert (Milestone, 2005) – recorded in 2001
- Sonny, Please (Doxy, 2006) – recorded in 2005-06
- Road Shows, Vol. 1 (Doxy, 2008)
- Road Shows, Vol. 3 (Doxy, 2014) – recorded in 2001-12
- Holding The Stage: Road Shows, Vol. 4 (Doxy, 2016)

With Paul Simon

- The Rhythm of the Saints (Warner Bros., 1990)
