= Roseanna Vitro =

American jazz singer and teacher (born 1951)

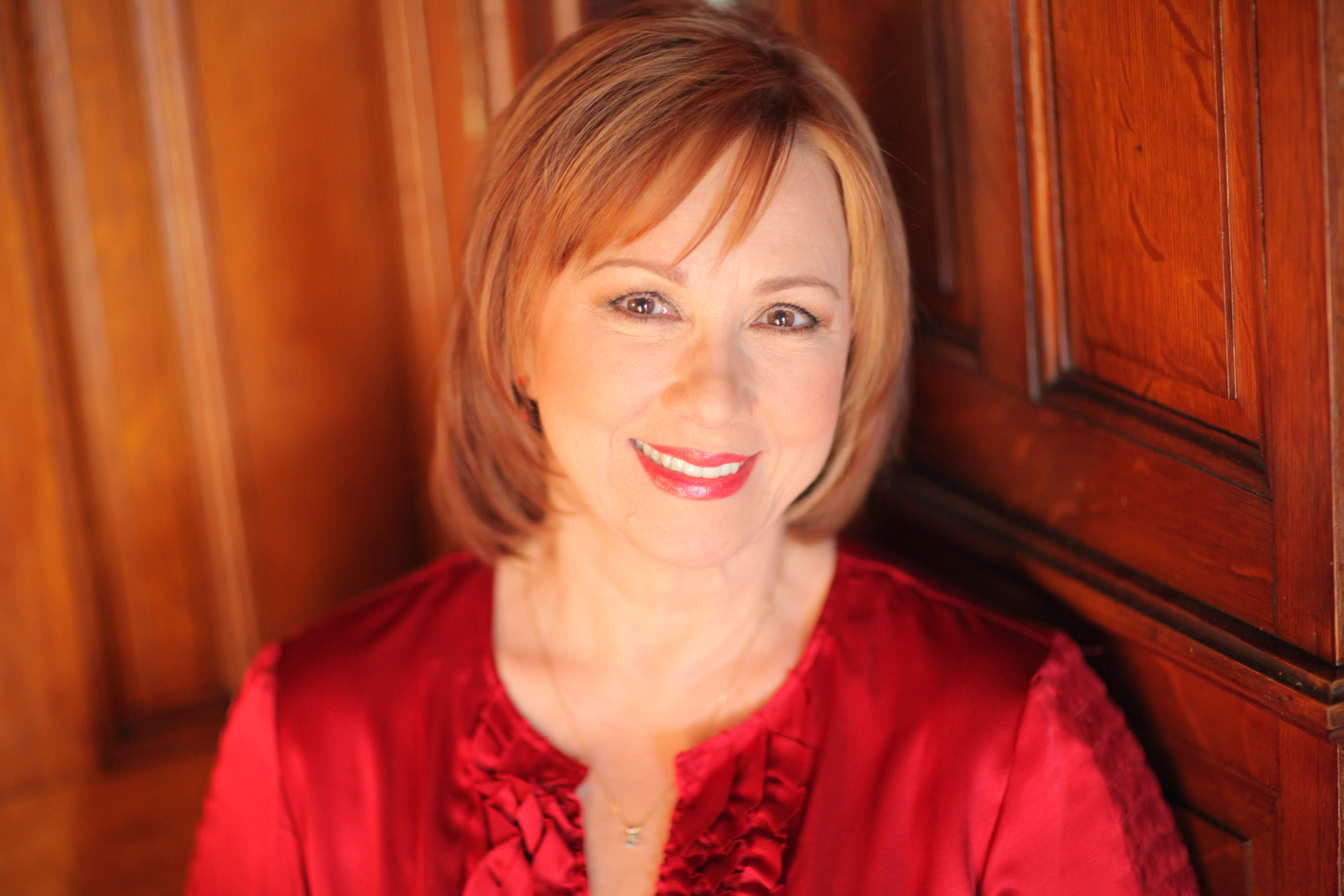
- Vitro in 2011

Background information
- Born: Roseanna Elizabeth Vitro; February 28, 1951 (age 75); Hot Springs, Arkansas, U.S.
- Genres: Jazz, vocal jazz
- Occupation: Singer
- Years active: 1985–present
- Labels: Skyline, Chase Music Group, Concord Jazz, Telarc, Sea Breeze, A Records, Challenge, Half Note, Motéma, Random Act
- Website: roseannavitrojazz.squarespace.com

Roseanna Elizabeth Vitro (born February 28, 1951) is a jazz singer and teacher from Arkansas.

== Biography ==
Born Roseanna Elizabeth Vitro in Hot Springs, Arkansas, on February 28, 1951, Vitro began singing at an early age, drawing inspiration from gospel, rock, rhythm and blues, musical theatre, and classical music. During the 1950s, her father owned a night club in Hot Springs called The Flamingo. He loved Dean Martin's music and opera, and her mother's family sang gospel. By the 1960s, she was determined to be a rock singer.

Vitro was exposed to jazz and it became her genre of choice after moving to Houston, Texas in the 1970s. Ray Sullenger discovered Vitro and presented her to the Houston jazz community where she sang frequently with Arnett Cobb. She worked for two years at the Green Room in Houston with her group Roseanna with Strings and Things and hosted a radio show on KUHF-FM. The band performed with Oscar Peterson, Bill Evans, Tommy Flanagan, and Keter Betts. Cobb, Peterson, and Sullenger encouraged her to dedicate herself to jazz.

In 1978, she moved to New York City with guitarist Scott Hardy and began to study with Gabor Carelli, a professor from the Manhattan School of Music, and began to perform with Kenny Werner and Fred Hersch. She sang with Lionel Hampton and toured with him. She appeared at The Blue Note, Iridium, Birdland, and Dizzy's Jazz Club at Lincoln Center. She appeared with Steve Allen at The Town Hall at The Apollo Theater and recorded an album of Allen's songs. In 2005 she performed and recorded with the Kenny Werner Trio at the John F. Kennedy Center in Washington D.C.

She has worked with Kenny Barron, Christian McBride, Elvin Jones, Gary Bartz, Kevin Mahogany, and David "Fathead" Newman, all of whom have appeared on her recordings. She was a guest on Marian McPartland's radio program Piano Jazz. Her album The Music of Randy Newman received 4 1/2 stars in Down Beat magazine and a Grammy nomination for Best Jazz Vocal Album in 2012.

Vitro taught vocal jazz at the State University of New York at Purchase and retired in 2017 as Vocal Jazz Chair at New Jersey City University and New Jersey Performing Arts Center. She holds workshops, concerts, and master classes. She has studied classical voice, ear-training, classical Indian vocal technique, Portuguese, piano, and jazz technique and concept.

== Awards and honors ==
- 1998 – Inducted into Arkansas Jazz Hall of Fame with Bob Dorough and John Stubblefield.
- 2004 – Selected U.S. Jazz Ambassador for The John F. Kennedy Center and The U.S. State Department, and The Rhythm Road: American Music Abroad featured artist in 2009 with her band JazzIAm.
- 2012 – Grammy nomination, Best Vocal Jazz Album for The Music of Randy Newman (Motéma, 2011)

== Discography ==
- Listen Here (Texas Rose Music, 1984; CD reissue: Skyline, 2021)
- A Quiet Place (Skyline, 1987)
- Reaching for the Moon (CMG/Chase Music Group [Skyline Productions], 1991)
- Softly (Concord Jazz, 1993)
- Passion Dance (Telarc, 1996)
- Catchin' Some Rays: The Music of Ray Charles (Telarc, 1997)
- The Time of My Life: Roseanna Vitro Sings the Songs of Steve Allen (Sea Breeze, 1999) - rec. 1986
- Conviction: Thoughts of Bill Evans (A Records, 2001)
- Tropical Postcards (A Records, 2004)
- Live at the Kennedy Center (Challenge, 2006)
- The Delirium Blues Project: Serve or Suffer (Half Note, 2008) - with Kenny Werner
- The Music of Randy Newman (Motéma, 2011)
- Clarity: Music of Clare Fischer (Random Act, 2014)
- Tell Me the Truth (Skyline, 2018)
- Sing a Song of Bird (Skyline, 2021) - with Bob Dorough, Sheila Jordan, Marion Cowings

Except where indicated, all information is from The Encyclopedia of Popular Music at Oxford Music Online.
