= KPBS =

KPBS may refer to:

- KPBS Public Media, a not-for-profit organization licensed to San Diego, California, United States
  - KPBS (TV), a television station (channel 19, virtual 15) licensed to San Diego, California, United States
  - KPBS-FM, a radio station (89.5 FM) licensed to San Diego, California, United States
- Konza Prairie Biological Station, a tallgrass prairie research center co-owned by Kansas State University and the Nature Conservancy

== See also ==
- KBPS (disambiguation)
