= Martha Barnette =

American writer and radio host

- Born: November 18, 1957 (age 68); Louisville, Kentucky
- Education: Vassar College (B.A.); University of Kentucky (graduate work)
- Occupations: Author, radio personality, radio producer
- Relatives: Henlee Hulix Barnette (father)
- Website: marthabarnette.com

Martha Barnette (born November 18, 1957) is an American writer, radio host, and public speaker. She is the co-host and co-producer of A Way with Words, a weekly, hour-long show about language broadcast nationally in the United States, and is the author of five books, four of them about etymology.

== Early life and education ==
Barnette was born in Louisville, Kentucky to Helen and Henlee Hulix Barnette. Her father was a Baptist minister and professor of Christian ethics and her mother a teacher. After attending Stetson University and Vanderbilt University, she graduated from Vassar College with a bachelor's degree in English in 1981. She subsequently did graduate work in classical languages at the University of Kentucky and studied Spanish at the ILISA Language Institute in Costa Rica.

== Career ==
=== Writing ===
After college, Barnette worked as a journalist at The Washington Post, The Louisville Times and The Courier-Journal in Louisville. In the mid-1980s she wrote several stories for the Washington Times about cardiac surgeon William DeVries, the first person to implant a whole artificial heart intended to be permanent, and in particular his second patient, Bill Schroeder and the Schroeder family. After Schroeder's death in August 1986, Barnette suggested the idea of a book about the story to his family. They worked with Barnette on the book, which was published in July 1987 as The Bill Schroeder Story: An Artificial Heart Patient's Historic Ordeal and the Amazing Family Effort that Supported Him. A Chicago Tribune review described the idea of the book as a "good one" but felt the execution to be "a bit indulgent", while the Courier-Journal described it as "straightforward but highly evocative".

Barnette has published four books on the origins of words: A Garden of Words in 1992, Ladyfingers & Nun's Tummies in 1997, Dog Days and Dandelions in 2003 and Friends with Words: Adventures in Languageland in 2025. The books are themed around flowers, food, animals, and etymology, respectively. Selecting Ladyfingers as one of the best non-fiction books of 1997, the Los Angeles Times described it as "a tour de force", and said that A Garden of Words had been a "fascinating study". People described it as "amusing". Publishers Weekly thought Dog Days was a "sprightly compendium".

As a freelance journalist, Barnette has contributed articles to magazines including Glamour and Reader's Digest.

=== Radio ===
Since 2004, Barnette has co-hosted A Way with Words, a call-in show about language. Initially her co-host was author Richard Lederer. Lederer left the show in October 2006 and since January 2007 Barnette has hosted the show with lexicographer Grant Barrett.

Barnette, Barrett and senior producer Stefanie Levine founded the 501(c)(3) organization Wayword, Inc., to fund and produce A Way with Words after KPBS-FM, which had originally produced it, withdrew support. To operate Wayword, Inc. successfully, Barnette studied for a Certificate in Fundraising Management from the Indiana University Lilly Family School of Philanthropy.

== Bibliography ==
- The Bill Schroeder Story: An Artificial Heart Patient's Historic Ordeal and the Amazing Family Effort that Supported Him (1987, with the Schroeder family) ISBN 978-0-688-06893-6
- A Garden of Words (1992) ISBN 978-0-595-34749-0
- Ladyfingers & Nun's Tummies: A Lighthearted Look at How Foods Got Their Names (1997) ISBN 978-0-595-34503-8
- Dog Days and Dandelions: A Lively Guide to the Animal Meanings Behind Everyday Words (2003) ISBN 978-0-312-28072-7
- Friends with Words: Adventures in Languageland (2025) ISBN 978-1-419-77884-1
