= Henlee Hulix Barnette =

American professor of Christian ethics

- Born: August 14, 1911; Taylorsville, North Carolina, U.S.
- Died: October 20, 2004 (aged 93); Louisville, Kentucky, U.S.
- Children: 4, including Martha Barnette

Academic background
- Education: Wake Forest College
- Alma mater: Southern Baptist Theological Seminary

Academic work
- Discipline: Christian ethics

Henlee Hulix Barnette (August 14, 1911 – October 20, 2004) was an American social activist, professor of Christian ethics, minister, and author. His first book, Introducing Christian Ethics (1961), became a standard text in his field. He marched with Martin Luther King Jr. and met with Nikita Khrushchev to set up a college student exchange program with the Soviet Union.

== Education and early life ==
Barnette was born on August 14, 1911, in Taylorsville, North Carolina. He dropped out of school in the sixth grade and his family moved to Kannapolis, North Carolina in 1925. He converted to Christianity there at the age of 19 and returned to school at age 22 on the advice of his pastor, Wade Jones. He graduated at age 26 and went on to study at Wake Forest College, from where he graduated with honors in 1940.

After Wake Forest College, Barnette attended Southern Baptist Theological Seminary ("Southern") in Louisville, Kentucky, where he received a Master's in Theology and a PhD. He later studied at Harvard University, Columbia University and the University of Florida.

== Career ==
Barnette's first teaching position was at Samford University (then Howard College), in Birmingham, Alabama, from 1946 to 1947 as a professor of sociology, followed by Stetson University in Florida from 1947 to 1951. In 1951, he joined the faculty at Southern, where he remained until 1977. From 1956 to 1959 he was acting dean of the School of Theology there. After 26 years teaching at Southern, Barnette went on to work at the University of Louisville Medical School, teaching psychiatry from 1977 until 1992.

Barnette wrote widely on topics in Christian ethics and particularly biomedical ethics. His 1961 work Introducing Christian Ethics was a standard text. His other works include a book about New Testament Greek scholar Clarence Jordan, in 1992, about whom he had given the lecture "Clarence Jordan: A prophet in blue jeans" in April 1983, and a memoir, A Pilgrimage of Faith: My Journey, completed shortly before his death. In all, he authored fifteen books.

For most of his life, Barnette was a committed Baptist. He first converted to Christianity at the North Kannapolis Baptist Church in Kannapolis, North Carolina. He was ordained a minister in 1935. While at graduate school at Southern he ministered at the Haymarket Mission in Louisville, where he was head of the mission for three years, and was referred to as the "Bishop of the Haymarket". Later, having moved back to Louisville, he was a member of the Crescent Hill Baptist Church there.

== Social advocacy ==
Barnette was focused on race as a social issue from at least 1946. He helped to found the Interracial Baptist Pastors Conference in Birmingham Alabama while at Samford. On June 7, 1954, Barnette testified before a subcommittee of Congress in favor of strengthening the role of the United Nations.

In 1957, he met with Nikita Khrushchev at the Kremlin and helped establish an exchange program for college students between the United States and the Soviet Union. In 1961, having marched for civil rights, Barnette invited Dr. Martin Luther King Jr. to speak at Southern and helped to arrange that visit, where King gave the Julian Brown Gay Lectures. He marched with King in Frankfort, Kentucky. As a result of the meeting with Khrushchev and his relationship with King, Barnette was the subject of FBI investigation and surveillance between 1957 and 1974. In 1971 he helped in the establishment of a Black Church Studies program.

== Personal life ==
Barnette married twice, first to Charlotte Ford, with whom he had two sons, John and Wayne. After Charlotte's death in childbirth in 1953, Barnette was remarried in 1956 to Helen Poarch, with whom he had a daughter, Martha, and a son, James, known as Jim. His oldest son, John, served in the United States Air Force in the Vietnam War. His second son, Wayne, moved to Sweden at the same time to avoid the draft. Barnette himself was vocally opposed to US engagement in Vietnam. His daughter, Martha Barnette, is also an author and presents the weekly radio show A Way with Words on the subject of language. James taught as a professor of religion at Samford University and served as pastor of Brookwood Baptist Church in Mountain Brook, Alabama.

Barnette died on October 20, 2004, in Louisville, Kentucky. His funeral was held at the Crescent Hill Baptist Church of Louisville on October 25.

The Henlee Hulix Barnette Papers are available for research at Wake Forest University.

== Bibliography ==
=== Books ===
- Introducing Christian Ethics. Broadman Press. 1961. ISBN 978-0-8054-6102-2.
- Communism: Who? What? Why?. Broadman Press. 1962. OCLC 6465743.
- An Introduction to Communism. Baker Book House. 1964. OCLC 4898273.
- Christian Calling and Vocation. Baker Book House. 1965. OCLC 2149237.
- The New Theology and Morality. Westminster Press. 1967. ISBN 9780664247539. OCLC 246165217.
- Has God Called You?. Broadman Press. 1969. OCLC 23407.
- Crucial problems in Christian perspective. Westminster Press. 1970. ISBN 978-0-664-24882-6.
- The Drug Crisis in the Church. Westminster Press. 1971. OCLC 154476.
- The Church and the Ecological Crisis. Eerdmans. 1972. ISBN 978-0-8028-1457-9.
- Biblical Perspectives on Bioethical Problems. Stetson University. 1981. OCLC 8103805.
- Exploring Medical Ethics. Mercer University Press. 1982. ISBN 978-0-86554-031-6.
- Your Freedom to Be Whole. Westminster Press. 1984. ISBN 978-0-664-24526-9.
- Clarence Jordan: Turning Dreams Into Deeds. Smyth & Helwys. 1992. ISBN 978-1-880837-00-9.
- A Pilgrimage of Faith: My Story. Mercer University Press. 2004. ISBN 978-0-86554-942-5.
- Homely Joys: Prayers, Poems, and Barbs. Christian Ethics Today. 2005. ISBN 978-0-914520-46-7. (with James Barnette)

=== Selected articles ===
- "The Southern Baptist Theological Seminary and the Civil Rights Movement: From 1859–1952, Part One". Review & Expositor (90). 1993.
- "The Southern Baptist Theological Seminary and the Civil Rights Movement: The Visit of Martin Luther King Jr, Part Two". Review & Expositor (93). 1996.
