= Richard Lederer (writer) =

American linguist

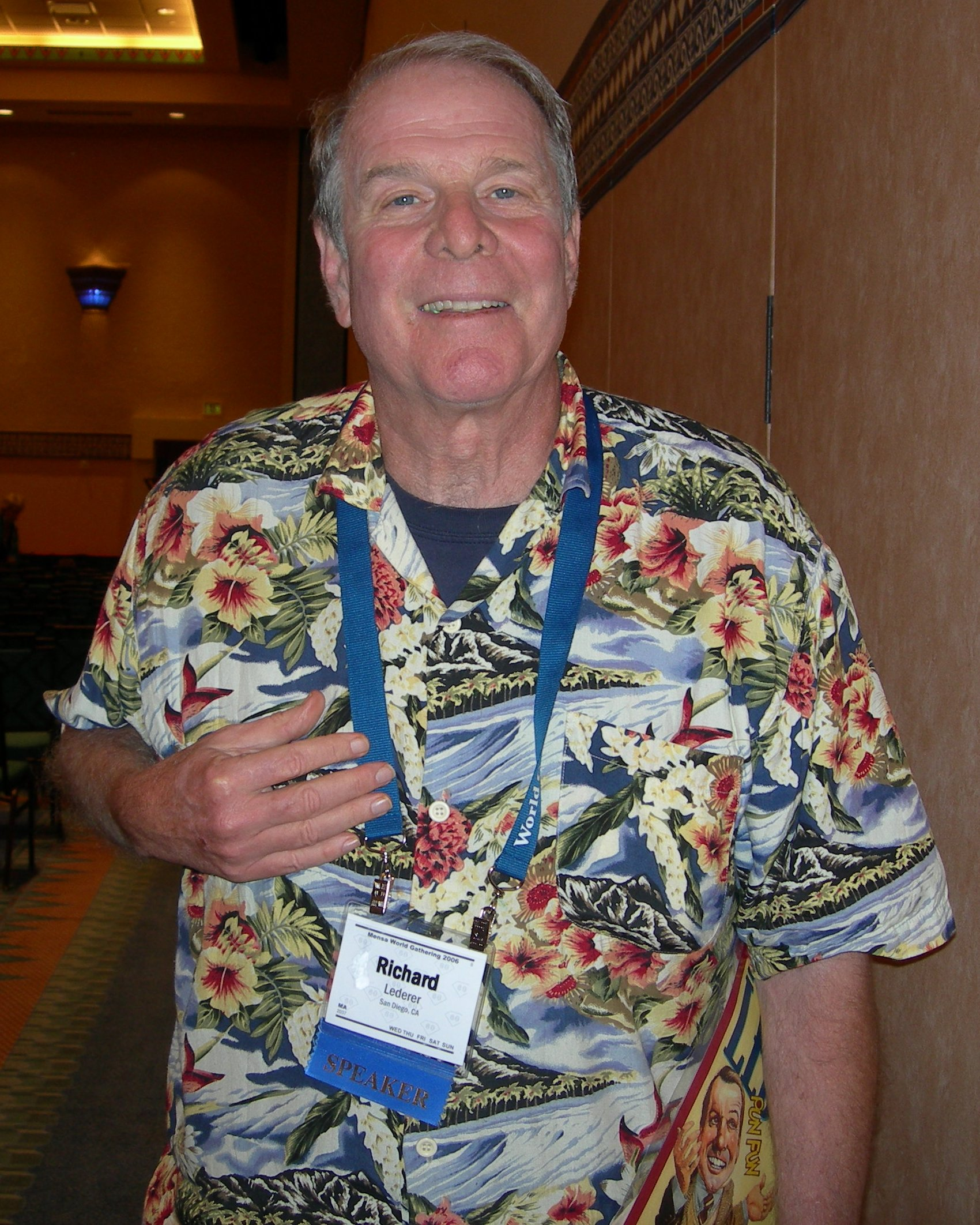
- Lederer at the 2006 Mensa World Gathering
- Born: 1938 (age 87–88)
- Education: Haverford College (BA); Harvard University (MA); University of New Hampshire (PhD)
- Occupations: Linguist, educator, writer
- Spouse(s): Rhoda Spangenberg (div.) Simone Egeren (m. 1992)
- Children: Howard, Annie, and Katy
- Website: verbivore.com

Richard Lederer (born 1938) is an American linguist, author, speaker, and teacher. He is best known for his books on the English language and on wordplay such as puns, oxymorons, and anagrams. He has been dubbed "the Wizard of Idiom," "Attila the Pun," and "Conan the Grammarian." His weekly column, "Lederer on Language," appears in the San Diego Union-Tribune and his articles are in newspapers and magazines throughout the United States including the Mensa Bulletin.

He was elected International Punster of the Year in 1989 and was the 2002 recipient of the Golden Gavel of Toastmasters International.

== Early life and education ==
The youngest of five children, Lederer grew up in West Philadelphia. He graduated from Haverford College as a pre-med student. He attended Harvard Law School for one year, then switched to the Master of Arts in teaching program at Harvard University. He taught English and media at the St. Paul's School in Concord, New Hampshire for 27 years until 1989. In 1980, he earned a PhD in Linguistics from the University of New Hampshire. His Jewish parents were from Poland and Germany, and he had a bar mitzvah.

== Career ==
He has written more than 50 books, including Anguished English books starting in 1987, Get Thee to a Punnery (1988), Crazy English (1989), The Miracle of Language (1992), Amazing Words (2011), and The Joy of Names (2018).

Known as a "verbivore," a word he coined in the late 1980s, Lederer's interests include uncovering word and phrase origins, pointing out common grammatical errors and fallacies, and exploring palindromes, anagrams, and other forms of recreational wordplay.

His books about various subjects other than language include Presidential Trivia (2007), A Treasury for Cat Lovers (2009) and A Treasury for Dog Lovers (2009), The Gift of Age (2011), A Tribute to Teachers (2011), and American Trivia with Caroline McCullagh (2012).

In 1998, he and Charles Elster became the first co-hosts of the weekly radio show, A Way with Words, produced by KPBS, San Diego Public Radio, and broadcast by multiple stations throughout the United States. In October 2006, Lederer retired from A Way with Words and was replaced by Grant Barrett. He continues broadcasting through regular guest appearances on several major market public and Clear-Channel commercial radio stations.

Lederer makes more than a hundred appearances each year, many of them benefit performances in San Diego.

== Personal life ==
Lederer and his first wife, Rhoda, have three children: Howard Lederer and Annie Duke, both world-renowned poker players, and Katy Lederer, an author and poet.

Lederer married Simone van Egeren in 1992.

== Publications ==
Richard Lederer has had over 50 titles published.

=== Books ===
- Adventures of a Verbivore—Published by Pocket Books (March 1995)
- Crazy English—Published by Gallery Books (June 1998)
- The Miracle of Language—Published by Gallery Books (April 1999)
- A Man of My Words: Reflections on the English Language—Published by St. Martin's Press (October 2005)
- Word Wizard: Super Bloopers, Rich Reflections, and Other Acts of Word Magic, collection of essays—Published by St. Martin's Press (March 2006)
- A Treasury for Dog Lovers: Wit and Wisdom, Information and Inspiration About Man's Best Friend—Published by Howard Books (October 2009)
- A Treasury for Cat Lovers: Wit and Wisdom, Information and Inspiration About Our Feline Friends—Published by Howard Books (October 2009)
- The Gift of Age: Wit and Wisdom, Information and Inspiration for the Chronologically Endowed, and Those Who Will Be—Published by Marion Street Press (April 2011)
- A Tribute to Teachers: Wit and Wisdom, Information and Inspiration About Those Who Change Our Lives—Published by Marion Street Press (September 2011)
- Amazing Words: An Alphabetical Anthology of Alluring, Astonishing, Beguiling, Bewitching, Enchanting, Enthralling, Mesmerizing, Miraculous, Tantalizing, Tempting, and Transfixing Words—Published by Marion Street Press (September 2012)
- Lederer on Language: A Celebration of English, Good Grammar, and Wordplay, collection of essays—Published by Marion Street Press (November 2012)
- The Joy of Names—Published by Marion Street Press (September 2018)

=== Children's ===
- Pun and Games: Jokes, Riddles, Daffynitions, Tairy Fales, Rhymes, and More Word Play for Kids—Published by Chicago Review Press (June 1996)
- The Circus of Words: Acrobatic Anagrams, Parading Palindromes, Wonderful Words on a Wire, and More Lively Letter Play—Published by Chicago Review Press (May 2001)
- Wild & Wacky Animal Jokes, co-authored with Jim Ertner—Published by Marion Street Press (April 2011)
- Super Funny Animal Jokes, co-authored with Jim Ertner—Published by Marion Street Press (April 2011)
- Cleverly Comical Animal Jokes, co-authored with Jim Ertner—Published by Marion Street Press (April 2012)
- Rip Roaring Animal Jokes, co-authored with Jim Ertner—Published by Marion Street Press (April 2012)
- Animal Cracker Uppers Jr., co-authored with Jim Ertner—Published by Marion Street Press (November 2013)
- Monsters Unchained!: Over 1,000 Drop-Dead Funny Jokes, Riddles, and Poems about Scary, Slimy, Slithery, Spooky, Slobbery Creatures—Published by Marion Street Press (October 2014)

=== Trivia ===
- Literary Trivia: Fun and Games for Book Lovers—Published by Vintage Books (November 1994)
- Classic Literary Trivia—Published by Gibbs Smith (April 2007)
- Presidential Trivia—Published by Gibbs Smith (October 2007)
- American Trivia: What We All Should Know About U.S. History, Culture & Geography, co-authored with Caroline McCullagh—Published by Gibbs Smith (February 2012)
- American Trivia Quiz Book, co-authored with Caroline McCullagh—Published by Gibbs Smith (September 2014)

=== Puns and Jokes ===
- The Cunning Linguist: Ribald Riddles, Lascivious Limericks, Carnal Corn, and Other Good, Clean Dirty Fun—Published by St. Martin's Press (December 2003)
- The Giant Book Of Animal Jokes: Beastly Humor For Grownups, co-authored with Jim Ertner—Published by Stone and Scott (February 2006)
- Get Thee to a Punnery: An Anthology of Intentional Assaults Upon the English Language—Published by Gibbs Smith (April 2006)
- The Ants Are My Friends: A Punderful Celebration of Song, co-authored with Stan Kegel—Published by Marion Street Press (September 2007)

=== Bloopers ===
- Anguished English: An Anthology of Accidental Assaults Upon Our Language—Published by Bantam Doubleday Dell (August 1989)
- More Anguished English: An Exposé of Embarrassing Excruciating, and Egregious Errors in English—Published by Bantam Doubleday Dell (September 1994)
- Fractured English—Published by Gallery Books (November 1996)
- The Bride of Anguished English: A Bonanza of Bloopers, Blunders, Botches, and Boo-Boos—Published by t. Martin's Press (July 2002)
- The Revenge of Anguished English: More Accidental Assaults Upon Our Language—Published by St. Martin's Press (April 2005)

=== Holiday ===
- Puns Spooken Here: Word Play for Halloween—Published by Gibbs Smith (July 2006)
- Have Yourself a Punny Little Christmas—Published by Gibbs Smith (July 2006)
- Hilarious Holiday Humor, co-authored with Stan Kegel—Published by Marion Street Press (April 2013)

=== Language Skills ===
- Theme and Paragraph, co-authored with Philip Burnham—Published by Longman Publishing Group (June 1976)
- Basic Verbal Skills, co-authored with Philip Burnham—Published by Longman Publishing Group (June 1980)
- The Write Way: The S.P.E.L.L. Guide to Real-Life Writing, co-authored with Richard Dowis—Published by Pocket Books (October 1995)
- Sleeping Dogs Don't Lay: Practical Advice For The Grammatically Challenged, co-authored with Richard Dowis—Published by [St. Martin's Press (September 1999)
- Comma Sense: A Fundamental Guide to Punctuation, co-authored with John Shore—Published by St. Martin's Press (August 2005)

=== Word Games ===
- The Play of Words—Published by Gallery Books (September 1991)
- The Word Circus—Published by Merriam-Webster (January 1998)
- The Big Book of Word Play Crosswords: 100 Unique Challenging Puzzles for Word Play Lovers, co-authored with Gayle Dean—Published by Marion Street Press (May 2013)
- Challenging Words for Smart People: Bringing Order to the English Language—Published by Marion Street Press (June 2016)
