= Crossing South =

American travel television (2011–present)

- Genre: Travel
- Presented by: Jorge Meraz
- Country of origin: United States

Production
- Production company: Centurion5

Original release
- Release: 2011

Crossing South is an American travel television series created in 2011 for syndication by Centurion5 Productions based in San Diego, California. The program explores Tijuana and Northern Baja, demystifying the Mexican region. Bilingual host Jorge Meraz takes viewers on a journey to meet the people, foods, customs, and destinations frequented by the locals.

The program has been airing since 2011 on the PBS affiliate in San Diego, KPBS, and has also aired in 13 cities across the US and has been green lit for distribution through participating PBS stations throughout the US on the NETA and CREATE systems.
