= Grant Barrett =

American lexicographer

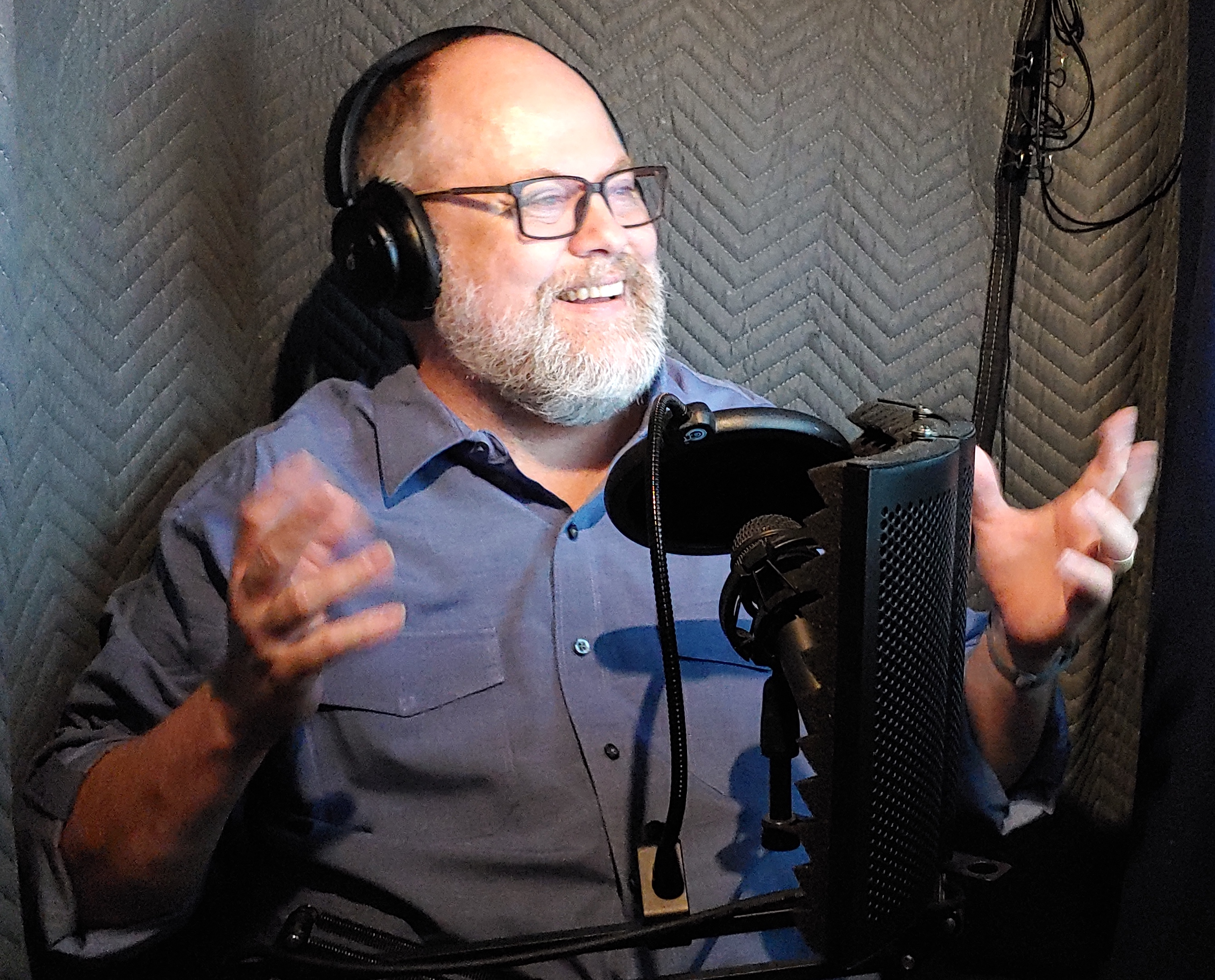
- Grant Barrett recording his radio show A Way with Words
- Born: 1970 (age 55–56); Missouri, United States
- Education: Columbia University
- Occupations: Lexicographer, author, radio show host
- Website: grantbarrett.com

Grant Barrett (born 1970) is an American lexicographer, specializing in slang, jargon and new usage, and the author and compiler of language-related books and dictionaries. He is a co-host and co-producer of the American weekly, hour-long public radio show and podcast A Way with Words. He has made regular appearances on Christopher Kimball's Milk Street Radio, is often consulted as a language commentator, and has written for The New York Times and The Washington Post, and served as a lexicographer for Oxford University Press and Cambridge University Press.

== Education ==
Grant holds a degree in French from Columbia University and has studied at the Université Paris Diderot and the University of Missouri-Columbia, where he was the editor in chief of the student newspaper, The Maneater (1990–91).

== Career ==
He was an early blogger with the website World New York, which has been archived by the Library of Congress as part of its September 11 Web archive to preserve the blog's collection of responses to the 9/11 attacks.

In 2007, following the retirement of Richard Lederer from the radio show A Way with Words, Barrett became a co-host and eventually a co-producer of the public radio show, which is broadcast nationally in the United States. He co-hosts the show with writer/public speaker Martha Barnette. The caller-based radio show takes a sociolinguistic perspective towards language.

Barnette, Barrett, and senior producer Stefanie Levine founded the 501(c)(3) organization Wayword, Inc., to fund and produce A Way with Words after KPBS-FM, which had originally produced it, withdrew support.

Barrett is the author of the books Perfect English Grammar (Zephyros Press, 2016, ISBN 978-1623157142) and The Official Dictionary of Unofficial English (McGraw Hill Professional, 2010, ISBN 0071491635, 9780071491631). Perfect English Grammar is a 238-page book on writing and speaking the English language. The Official Dictionary of Unofficial English is based on his Double-Tongued Dictionary and World New York websites, and includes new and unusual words.

As an editor and lexicographer, he compiled the Oxford Dictionary of American Political Slang (Oxford University Press, 2004, ISBN 0-19-517685-5), originally titled Hatchet Jobs and Hardball: The Oxford Dictionary of American Political Slang, and the award-winning web site Double-Tongued Dictionary.

In 2008, he was an emcee in the finals of the American Crossword Puzzle Tournament alongside Merle Reagle.

He is the vice president of communications and technology for the American Dialect Society, a former member of the editorial review board for the academic journal American Speech, former contributor and editor of the journal's "Among the New Words" column, and a co-founder of the online dictionary Wordnik.

Between 2004 and 2014, Barrett created an annual words-of-the-year list which has been featured in The New York Times and The Dallas Morning News.

Barrett frequently comments on language matters in the popular press, as a radio and podcast guest, as a writer, and as a quoted source. He has been a frequent public speaker with his radio partner and on his own, including for TEDxAmericasFinestCity in 2011 and TEDxSDSU in 2012.

Besides the publications given above, he has also written for The Washington Post and The Malaysia Star.

== Bibliography ==
=== Author ===
- Perfect English Grammar (Zephyros Press, 2016, ISBN 978-1623157142)
- The Official Dictionary of Unofficial English (McGraw Hill Professional, 2010, ISBN 0071491635, 9780071491631)
- Oxford Dictionary of American Political Slang (Oxford University Press, 2004, ISBN 0-19-517685-5)

=== Lexicographer ===
- Cambridge Dictionary of American English (second edition, 2008, ISBN 9780521691970)
- Cambridge Academic Content Dictionary (2008, ISBN 0521871433, 9780521871433)
- Collins British English Advanced Dictionary (2008, ISBN 978-1424008254)
- Collins Cobuild English/Japanese Dictionary of Advanced English (2008, ISBN 1424000793)
- Collins Spanish Intermediate Dictionary (2008, ISBN 0007260547, 9780007260546)
- Oxford American Writer’s Thesaurus (first edition, 2004, ISBN 0195342844, 9780195342840)
- New Oxford American Dictionary (2001, first edition, and 2005, second edition, ISBN 0195170776)
- Concise Oxford American Thesaurus (2006, ISBN 0195304853)
- Concise Oxford American Dictionary (2006, ISBN 0195304845, 978-0195304848)
