= Akeelah and the Bee =

2006 film by Doug Atchison

- Theatrical release poster
- Directed by: Doug Atchison
- Written by: Doug Atchison
- Produced by: Laurence Fishburne; Sid Ganis; Nancy Hult Ganis; Danny Llewelyn; Michael Romersa
- Starring: Laurence Fishburne; Angela Bassett; Keke Palmer; Curtis Armstrong
- Cinematography: David Mullen
- Edited by: Glenn Farr
- Music by: Aaron Zigman
- Production companies: Lionsgate; 2929 Entertainment; Starbucks Entertainment; Out of the Blue Entertainment; Reactor Films; Cinema Gypsy Productions (Note: The credits for the film reads "A Lionsgate, 2929 Productions and Starbucks Entertainment presentation of an Out of the Blue and Reactor Films production in association with Cinema Gypsy Productions.")
- Distributed by: Lionsgate
- Release dates: March 16, 2006 (CIFF); April 28, 2006 (United States)
- Running time: 112 minutes
- Country: United States
- Language: English
- Budget: $6–8 million
- Box office: $19 million

Akeelah and the Bee is a 2006 American drama film written and directed by Doug Atchison. It tells the story of Akeelah Anderson (Keke Palmer), an 11-year-old girl who participates in the Scripps National Spelling Bee, her mother (Angela Bassett), her schoolmates, and her coach, Dr. Joshua Larabee (Laurence Fishburne). The cast also features Curtis Armstrong, J. R. Villarreal, Sean Michael Afable, Erica Hubbard, Lee Thompson Young, Julito McCullum, Sahara Garey, Eddie Steeples, and Tzi Ma.

The film was developed over a period of 10 years by Atchison, who came up with the initial concept after seeing the 1994 Scripps National Spelling Bee and noting that a majority of the competitors came from well-off socioeconomic backgrounds. After completing the script in 1999, Atchison won one of the Nicholl Fellowships in Screenwriting in 2000, which attracted producers Sid Ganis and Nancy Hult Ganis. After an initial inability to secure funding, the project got a second wind as a result of the success of the 2002 documentary film Spellbound. Lionsgate Films undertook the production in 2004 and in the following year it was filmed in South Los Angeles on a budget of over $6 million.

Atchison remarked that his theme for the film, deemed an inspirational film, was about overcoming obstacles despite difficult challenges along the way. He also said that he wanted to portray African Americans in a manner that was not stereotypical and tried to show how African-American children incorporate some stereotypes. The film alludes to the importance of community as well as to problems black communities face. It also deals with esteem and stigma in school while criticizing the public school system. Cast members said that although the film was aimed at children, they considered it had important lessons for the parents as well.

Released in the United States on April 28, 2006, Akeelah and the Bee was positively received by critics and audiences. Reviewers praised its storyline and cast, lauding Palmer's performance, although a few critics panned the story as familiar and formulaic, and were critical of the portrayal of Asian-American characters. The film grossed $19 million, and received a number of awards and nominations, including the Black Reel Awards and the NAACP Image Awards. Film critics highly praised it for avoiding African-American stereotypes common in Hollywood films, while scholars were less favorable, even saying it reinforces some clichés.

== Plot ==
11-year-old spelling enthusiast Akeelah Anderson attends the predominantly black Crenshaw Middle School in South Los Angeles. She lives with her widowed mother Tanya, her three older siblings Kiana, Devon, and Terrence, and Kiana's infant daughter, Mikayla. Akeelah's principal, Mr. Bob Welch, encourages her to enter the Crenshaw Spelling Bee. She initially refuses, but enters after being threatened with detention for the remainder of the semester due to her frequent truancy, and wins.

Visiting English professor Dr. Joshua Larabee is impressed by Akeelah's spelling talent and believes she has a chance of winning the Scripps National Spelling Bee, but declines to coach her after they argue over her use of African American Vernacular English. During the final round of the district bee, Akeelah is almost eliminated, but is given another chance after Kiana catches one of the other finalists cheating. Akeelah befriends fellow speller Javier Mendez, who invites her to join the spelling club at his Woodland Hills middle school.

At Woodland Hills, Akeelah meets Dylan Chiu, a Chinese-American boy who has finished second at the past two national spelling bees and is in his final year of eligibility. After Akeelah misspells a word, Dylan contemptuously advises her to find a coach. When an increasingly stressed Tanya discovers Akeelah has been traveling alone to Woodland Hills, she forbids Akeelah from participating in the regional bee and enrolls her in summer school to make up for her absences. Akeelah forges her deceased father's signature on the consent form and apologizes to Dr. Larabee for her rudeness before convincing him to coach her for the state bee, with her mother unaware of her disobedience.

At Javier's birthday party, Akeelah nearly beats Dylan in Scrabble, after which she overhears Dylan's overly competitive father berating him for almost losing to a "little black girl." At the state bee, Tanya finally discovers Akeelah’s secret when she receives an unexpected invitation from Javier's parents; when she arrives, she orders her daughter off the stage and chastises her for her dishonesty. Javier intentionally stalls to allow Akeelah to return to the stage in time for her next turn. After speaking to Dr. Larabee and Mr. Welch, Tanya reluctantly allows Akeelah to continue, and she advances to Scripps, along with Dylan and Javier.

As Christmas approaches, Dr. Larabee tells Akeelah that he is resigning as her coach, and gives her 5,000 flashcards to study despite her protests. Feeling abandoned by Dr. Larabee, distanced from her best friend Georgia, and pressured by her community to win and make them proud, Akeelah loses her motivation. Encouraged by Tanya, Akeelah recruits her siblings, classmates, teachers, friends, and neighbors to help her prepare. As the day of the national bee approaches, Akeelah visits Dr. Larabee, who confesses that she reminds him of his late daughter, Denise, who died of a terminal illness when she was younger than Akeelah. He agrees to accompany her to Washington, D.C., along with Tanya, Mr. Welch, and Devon. Akeelah also invites Georgia, rekindling their friendship.

After all the other competitors, including Javier, are eliminated during the national bee, the competition comes down to Akeelah and Dylan. During a break, Akeelah overhears Dylan's father aggressively pressuring him to win, so she intentionally misspells a word ("xanthosis," the same word Dylan asked her to spell when they first met) to help him win, but Dylan, appalled by Akeelah's decision and fed up with his father's competitive nature, intentionally misspells the same word. He then tells her he wants a fair competition. The two then proceed to spell all the remaining words in the final round correctly until they are eventually declared co-champions after Akeelah spells "pulchritude," the same word she misspelled when she first met Dr. Larabee.

== Cast ==
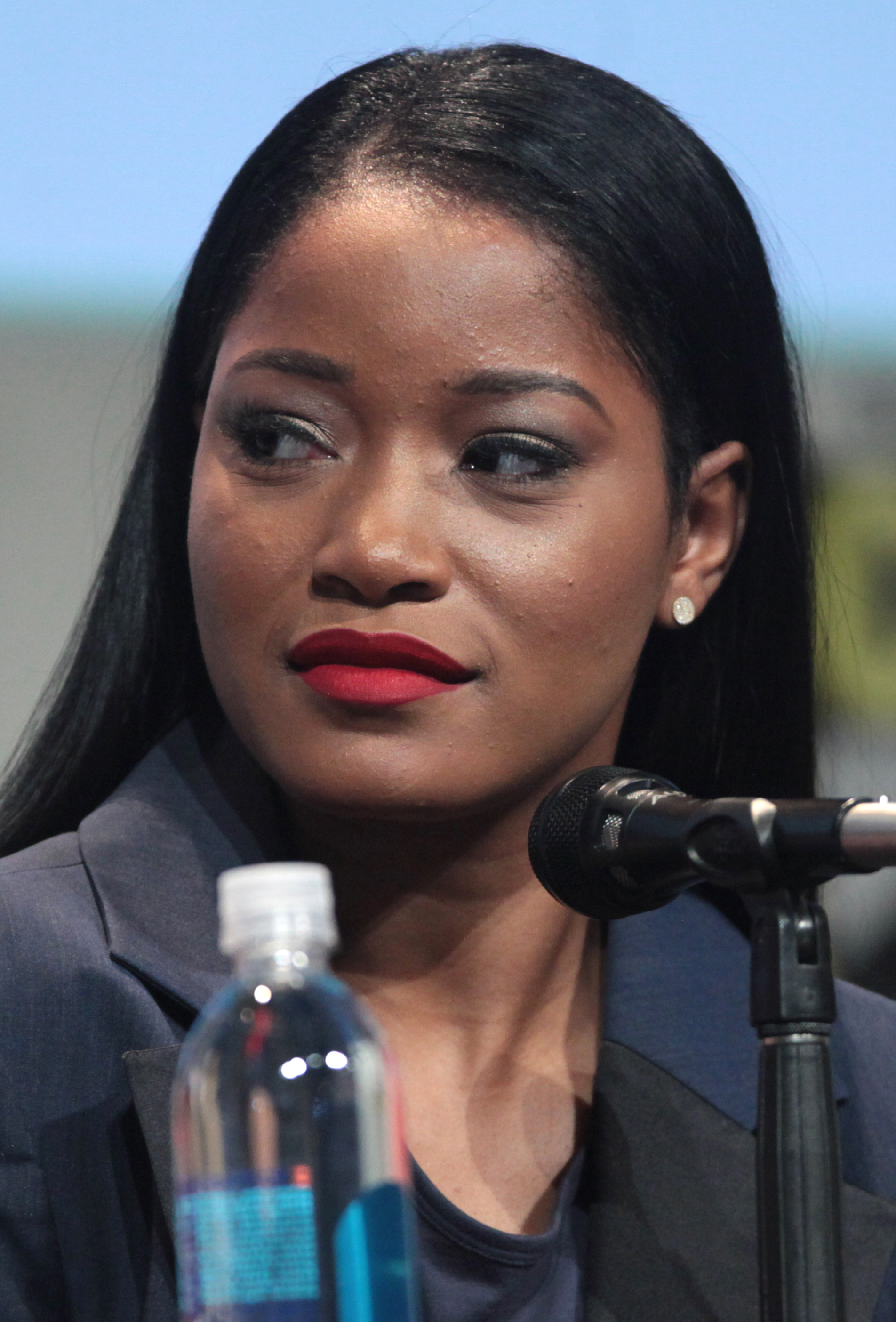
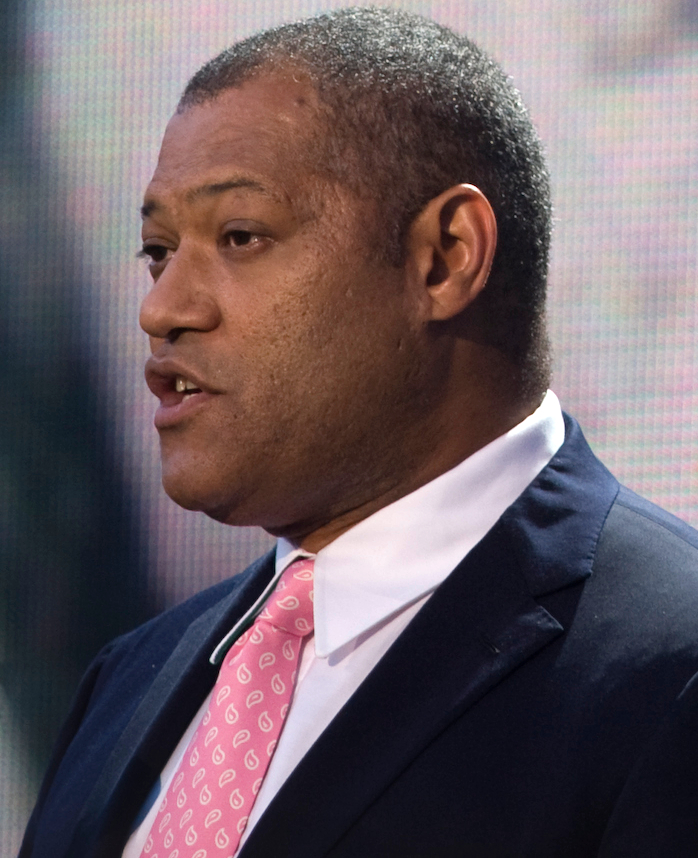
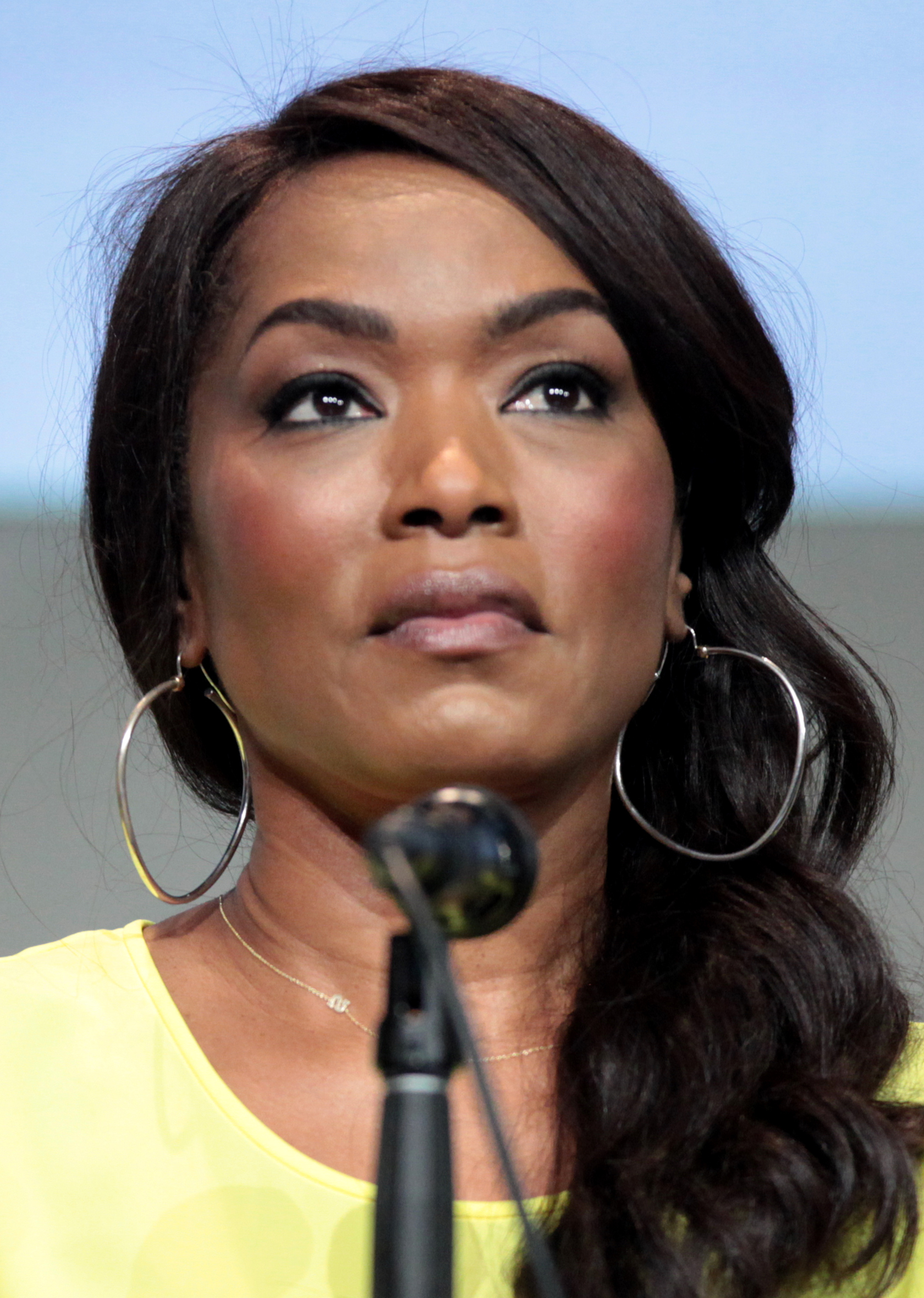
Keke Palmer, Laurence Fishburne and Angela Bassett were the protagonists of the film. Both Fishburne and Bassett were attracted by its history; Fishburne said he was "really moved by it", and Bassett "just loved" it.
- Keke Palmer as Akeelah Anderson:

Three hundred girls auditioned for the role of Akeelah in Los Angeles, New York and Atlanta, with Palmer having auditioned five times to get the part. Atchison liked Palmer's acting, but the major factor in choosing her was that at only age ten Palmer already had a profound interpretation of the script. He chose her as he did not want a kid whom he would command but instead someone with whom he could have a collaboration: someone who would understand the role and "would make this character her own". He just assisted her to fully ensure that she would understand the character's feelings and would make "the right emotional choices".

- Laurence Fishburne as Dr. Joshua Larabee :

Fishburne was pleased by the concept of the film, stating he was "really moved by it", so that he accepted to take his part "at an affordable rate", according to producer Michael Romersa. He first read the script in 2002 and moved by the fact that "there were very few people with the courage" to "make this kind of movie" (Note: By "this kind of movie", Fishburne was saying that Akeelah and the Bee breaks up with common stereotypes of African Americans reinforced by media. He declared, "There are no gangsters in it; there are no rappers in it. Studios are looking for an easy way to make money; [with black films], it's comedy, or it's action, or it's 'ghetto fabulous.'" According to him, Hollywood "doesn't care about a young, disadvantaged black girl.") he also accepted to be a producer for the film. About the character, Atchison said that Larabee is "vulnerable" and "a very sensitive guy" that has "a quiet moral authority". He also asserted that Fishburne made Larabee "a fairly buttoned-up, stoic type" and "subtly more animated" than how he envisioned the character. Larabee is based upon a teacher, Robert Larabell, Atchison had in Phoenix, Arizona.

- Angela Bassett as Tanya Anderson:

Bassett's agent sent her the script which she "just loved". Atchison praised Bassett's portrayal of the character, asserting she "made Tanya a real person" after understanding "the thought process of the character". The director said Tanya wants the best for Akeelah but is reticent because she thinks "the dream will fail and make things worse". Bassett stressed that her character has to handle the pain of her husband's death in addition to having bills paid but that Tanya "gain[s] some measure of courage herself" inspired by Akeelah.

- Curtis Armstrong as Bob Welch:

Atchison pointed Armstrong "was the perfect choice for the school principal". About his character role in the film, he said, "Welch is very excitable and provides a lot of the comic relief in our story."

- J. R. Villarreal as Javier Mendez:

Villarreal was chosen by scouts at the Sheraton Hotel in south McAllen to go to the next phase in Dallas. After doing well in Dallas, he was sent to auditions in California and finally got the part. He commented that "Javier is a very good friend to Akeelah ... And also like his charisma, his character, he can always put a smile on your face. He really doesn't care what people think of him that much and he helps Akeelah out with that little matter because she cares very much what people think about her."

- Sean Michael Afable as Dylan Chiu (Chinese: 邱德倫; pinyin: Qiū Délún):

Akeelah's rival who can be "sometimes harsh and seemingly cutthroat", but this is because of the pressure his father puts on him. Afable notes that Dylan's "true character" is seen at the end of the film.

- Sahara Garey as Georgia Carver

Garey did "about six auditions" to take the role. She commented that about her character: "she encourages Akeelah, because she sees so many qualities in her that she doesn't think she herself has. Georgia aims lower, but she encourages Akeelah to aim higher."

Erica Hubbard, Lee Thompson Young, and Julito McCullum portray Akeelah's older siblings Kiana, Devon, and Terrence, respectively. Dalia Phillips appears as Akeelah's teacher, Ms. Cross, and Eddie Steeples as Derrick T. Tzi Ma takes the role of Mr. Chiu, Dylan's father, while Wolfgang Bodison plays Tanya's husband whose name is not spoken in film, although Akeelah is shown writing "James Anderson" on the consent form.

== Production ==
=== Writing ===
Doug Atchison first had the idea of making a film about spelling bees after watching the Scripps National Spelling Bee of 1994 and noticing that most of the contestants had "privileged backgrounds". Atchison also considered spelling bees to contain "all the drama and tension and entertainment value of a sporting event", and felt that this could be made into a film. From this, he got the idea to write a script following the story of a child who had talent for spelling bee but was from a low-income neighborhood so did not "have access to the resources or coaching to pursue it as these other kids had". He had the desire of making a "Rocky-like story" and although made it a "dramatic" plot, he declared it is "essentially a sports movie".

Atchison started his screenplay in 1999, when he wrote a five-page treatment in about a month. In addition to the fact he was working on other projects, Atchison said he waited years before starting to write because he "thought someone else would do it first". This did not happen, so he began to write by himself. Few changes were made in the process of transitioning from the original draft to the final product. One change was that at first, Akeelah's mother had a smaller role and Akeelah's father was alive. Also, Larabee had been an older man (72 years old), and a few characters were cut. However, Atchison has summarized that "the steps she goes through, the friends she's got, those were always the same."

=== Development ===
In 2000, Atchison submitted his script to the Academy of Motion Picture Arts and Sciences along with about 4,500 others, in hopes of winning the Nicholl Fellowships in Screenwriting. Atchison's script ended up being one of five scripts selected, and he won the grant. Editor Glenn Farr, then a member of the committee, offered to edit Atchison's film as soon as it was finished. Producer Sid Ganis was also attracted to the story during the award presentation ceremony. Nancy Hult Ganis, Sid's wife who was interested in public education, encouraged him to follow through with the film.

The film was produced by Lionsgate Films, 2929 Entertainment, Starbucks Entertainment, Out of the Blue Entertainment, Reactor Films and Cinema Gypsy Productions, with a budget around $6–8 million. However, the Ganis couple found it difficult to secure funding for the film. In August 2001, Danny Llewelyn's Panoptic Pictures acquired the rights of Atchison's script. In 2002, documentary Spellbound was released and attracted attention to spelling bees, which, according to Hult Ganis, "helped us in some way". In November 2004, Lionsgate Films announced they would fund and distribute the film; and in collaboration with 2929 Entertainment they would co-finance the production. In January 2006, Starbucks announced a partnership with Lionsgate to market it.

Another factor in not having a studio attached before was Atchison's desire to direct it as he wanted to ensure his story would remain the one he envisioned. Several studios wanted to turn Larabee's character into a white character but Atchison felt "it was important that Akeelah's mentor be someone that comes from her neighborhood, that looks like her." Lionsgate's President of Production Michael Paseornek agreed that Atchison should direct the script, claiming that he was the only person who could do it because the story "was in his heart and in his mind".

=== Filming ===
Filming began in February 2005; the crew filmed for ten hours a day for thirty-one days. The eleven-year-old Palmer had to follow the United States' child labor laws, which necessitated spending at least three hours a day at school, one on recreation, and one at lunch. Nevertheless, Palmer appeared in almost every scene, about which Ganis commented, "I honestly don't know how we figured it out, but we did". To get the filming done on time, Atchison storyboarded the scenes ahead of time and chatted with cinematographer David Mullen, the production designer Warren Young, and Glenn Farr to compile a list of scenes. This way, the filming team began each day knowing what shots they would take, their order, and the performances scheduled for each day. Most of the filming took place in South Los Angeles, which Atchison picked as the filming location due to their low budget. Scenes were also filmed at the University of Southern California, Hollywood Palladium—which stood in for the Grand Ballroom of the Washington, D.C. Hyatt Hotel—and Venice High School.

=== Authenticity ===
To bring authenticity to the film's portrayal of spelling bees, George Hornedo, who competed in spelling bees in real life, was hired to play contestant Roman and be "an unofficial technical consultant". Hornedo helped the actors to recreate "certain habits and idiosyncrasies they do on stage to help them spell". Thus, Akeelah skipping rope to memorize the words was added as "something that was normal for the spelling bee" but Atchison tried to create it in a "subtle" way as he thought the audience could consider this unrealistic. Hornedo and other children who had never acted before were cast because of their authentic portrayals of nervous contestants; other kids, in Atchison's eyes, were "too old in how they acted". Also, Jacques Bailly, who won the Scripps National Spelling Bee in 1980 and is currently the contest's official pronouncer, since 2003, played himself in the film.

To further help the staff, Atchison asked Paige Kimball, director of the Scripps National Spelling Bee, to be a consultant. Kimball "was amazed at not only at how precise it was in its recreation, but also how authentic the individuals and the casting for the event was". However, she and the organization did have some disagreements. Atchison has admitted that he originally created a more dramatic story than she wanted. However, he believed most of the disagreements were about technical procedures, "things you wouldn't even notice". For example, the children were originally sponsored by newspapers to compete, but Atchison felt this detail did not improve the story, so he removed it. There were some concerns about the screenplay, and Atchison changed some of them "because [he] thought it didn't matter one way or another so [he] just made them happy."

=== Music ===
The film features a musical score by Aaron Zigman, who wrote 45 minutes of compositions in two and a half weeks. He had planned to score Akeelah and the Bee over the holidays, but Lionsgate pushed its release date up, so Zigman was pressed for time to write the score. He drew inspiration from Fishburne's performance to write it. A soundtrack album consisting of 16 tracks was released by Lionsgate Records in a deal with BMG's RED Distribution on April 4, 2006. It peaked at number 193 on the Billboard 200, and reached the 19th and sixth spot on the Billboard Top Independent Albums and Top Soundtracks respectively. The original score, consisting of 37 tracks, was also released on April 4 as an iTunes exclusive.

== Themes and analysis ==
If you see African-American kids striving to do something in the movies, it's sports or singing or dancing. Here, we're engaging kids on their intellect. That, you don't see. These lies about black inferiority have been seeping into cinema, and that seeps into our kids. As a filmmaker, you can dig into these issues

— Doug Atchison

Commentators on Akeelah and the Bee opined it dealt with multiple themes, including race and racism, poverty, educational system, competition and sportsmanship, self-esteem, self-image, stigma, community, friendship, gender and sexism, age, class and classism, and empowerment. Atchison affirmed that its focus is not the spelling but "a kid who learns what she's good at, becomes proud of that and doesn't want to hide it anymore. It's overcoming the fear of being great, before you can be great." Sid Ganis described it as a film "about hope and doing great things against all the odds", while a New York Press reviewer declared it "addresses the human condition".

After attending USC School of Cinematic Arts and working at a youth center in South Los Angeles, Atchison incorporated his experiences from the neighborhood into the film; among them, he heard that children who do well in school are said to be "acting white". As a result, Atchison tried to use the film to show what causes these children to doubt their own abilities. These doubts are shown through the preconceptions Akeelah and other community members have that "Spelling Bee is for someone else". She "must first overcome her feelings of inadequacy", and when she discovers Larabee comes from her neighborhood and is a successful man, it "empowers her to ... accomplish this task." Fishburne stated the film's treatment of race extends beyond the dichotomy of struggle and success, and goes into the prejudice that many people hold against black people competing in mainstream society. Atchison elaborated, "it's about this girl's insecurity about doing a thing that she hasn't seen people who look like her doing". The director affirmed that African-American children in film usually aspire to nothing other than being successful in sports, music or dance. He argued that the film industry has disseminated "lies about black inferiority", so he was interested in focusing on their intellect rather than let them succumb to the stereotypes. Atchison noted he had created the project for all audiences "but particularly for kids of color to see a little black girl who does something powerful."

The director also attributed Akeelah's low-esteem and doubt of her own capacities to the public school system, where she is bullied and "her intellectual curiosity is kind of crushed". As such, Akeelah is portrayed as an "undermotivated student", who "unwilling to be stigmatized as a freak or a brainiac", avoids showing her abilities. According to Wesley Morris of The Boston Globe, the film shows "the contradiction gifted students feel in an inhospitable environment". Ann Hornaday from The Washington Post opined that Akeelah's sentence "Why would I want to represent a school that doesn't even have doors on the toilets?" is "one of the film's many subtle critiques of the country's education policies." Writing in the English Journal, Amanda L. Hodges said it suggests a new approach on teaching with the "50,000 coaches" part; she declared it deconstructs the image of teachers "as those who keep order and disseminate knowledge" and shows that "teaching is not an isolated activity that begins and ends at the classroom door".

Villarreal commented that the film "teaches you not to let your friends down", while Fishburne and Hornaday highlighted its theme of community. Marrit Ingman of The Austin Chronicle said the film indicates "a community-based, cooperative model of group success", while Justin Chang of Variety said it "focuses ... on the bee's community-uniting impact." Hodges said Akeelah goes to the spelling bee because she recognizes it "proves that someone from their neighborhood can achieve success, and her achievement is, in a real sense, their own". In contrast, Bernard Beck wrote for Multicultural Perspectives that it depicts "the success of individual perseverance", while Red Feather Journal's Kathryn Linder expressed a similar opinion about individual success. Nevertheless, Kenneth Turan of the Los Angeles Times commented "it raises important points about the ... obstacles to success that kids from poor neighborhoods face." The New York Press's reviewer went further and said social class was its "real subject" as it "depicts the basics of class mobility that are routinely taken for granted". However, Chang asserted it shows the spelling bee contest as "a democratizing force", while Rob Asghar, for The Seattle Times, wrote it treats English as "the quintessential American tool for success."

Both Fishburne and Bassett also remarked that an important message of Akeelah and the Bee is to "speak properly" rather than strictly in vernacular, although Bassett emphasized the importance of the film's themes beyond spelling and spelling bees. Atchison added that beyond learning how to spell words, Akeelah must learn the importance of the words. He said that Larabee "looks at Akeelah as a potential leader. He wants her to understand her history. She needs to know the importance of language – and competition." In spite of knowing its importance, it "deconstruct[s] the 'competition' paradigm of learning", according to Ingman. Fishburne noted not only children but parents can learn from the film; in his opinion, the most important is that they should pay attention to their children's abilities. Villarreal also felt that, through Dylan's father, parents would be able to ponder if they are "push[ing] their kids to follow their own dreams and not the children's dreams."

== Release and reception ==
=== Marketing and release ===
The film was promoted by coffee shop chain Starbucks as a result of a partnership between Lions Gate Entertainment and Starbucks Entertainment. In January 2006, approximately 8,300 Starbucks locations in the United States and Canada began a promotional campaign for the film involving spelling-related trivia games and promotions on cardboard cup sleeves. Variety stated that Lionsgate spent around $20 million with its market only, while Los Angeles Times reported a $25-million cost to both produce and market the film. Ford Motor Company also sponsored the film by providing a Lincoln Zephyr to chauffeur the cast and creators to and from a screening.

Akeelah and the Bee was first shown at the 2006 ShoWest on March 14, and later premiered as the opening film at the 30th Cleveland International Film Festival on March 16. On April 20, the film was screened at The Academy of Motion Picture Arts and Sciences in Beverly Hills, and it had a sneak preview in 900 theaters on April 22. With predictions of strong box-office returns by film critics, it was released nationwide in theaters on April 28, grossing $6,011,585 in its opening weekend from around 2,195 American theaters and ranking eighth at the box office. The film closed its run on July 14 and 20 domestically and internationally respectively, with $18,848,430 domestically and $110,994 internationally. While the film received positive reviews, critics noted that it was not doing as well financially as they had predicted, and Lionsgate's Michael Burns characterized the film's gross with the word "only".

Outside the United States, the film debuted at the Sprockets Toronto International Film Festival for Children on April 23, 2006, where it was elected the best film by the kids in the ages of 10 and 11. In the United Kingdom, Akeelah and the Bee was first shown at the Cambridge Film Festival on July 7, and it premiered in the British theaters on August 18. The film was also screened in October 2006 at the Rome Film Festival, in which it competed at the Alicy in the City section.

=== Home media ===
The film was released on DVD by Lionsgate Home Entertainment on August 29, 2006, becoming the first DVD offered for sale at Starbucks. Its bonus features on the single-disc DVD include seven deleted scenes and a 25-minute making-of video featuring Atchinson and the cast. DVD sales in the United States reached $5,391,947 as 317,942 copies were sold after one week on sale. By December 2006, American consumers had spent a total of $25,855,396 to purchase 1,512,498 copies, making it one of the three most profitable home video releases of Lionsgate in 2006.

=== Critical reaction ===
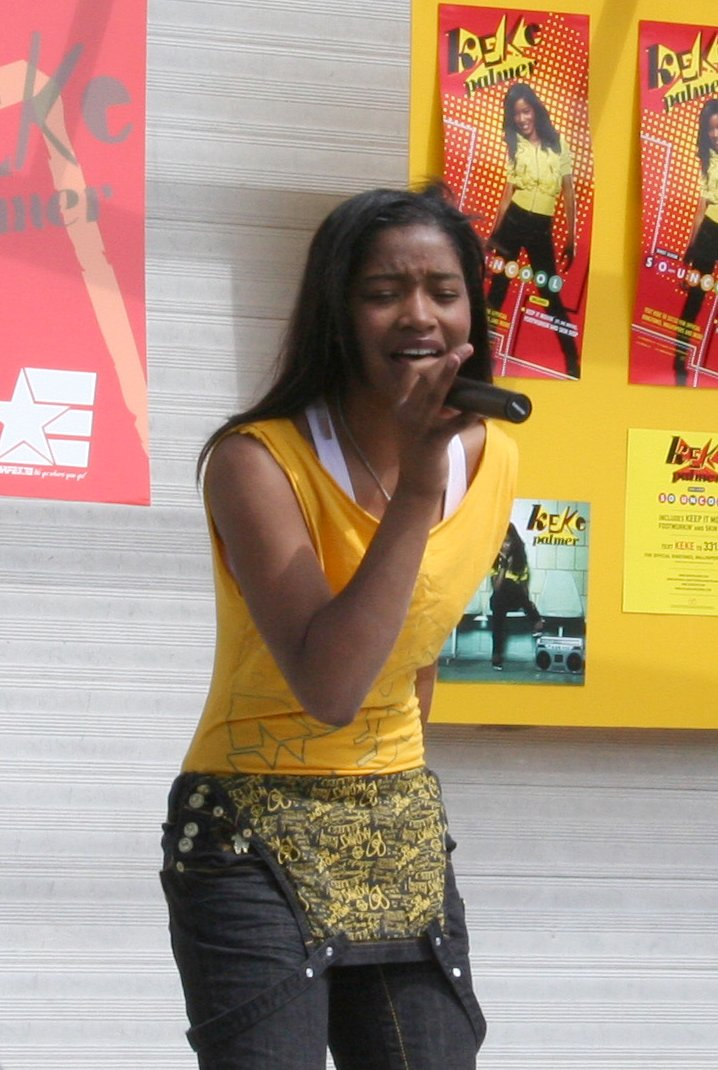
Keke Palmer's portrayal of Akeelah was highly praised by critics, with one saying she "[stole the] movie from Angela Bassett and Laurence Fishburne". Palmer's performance led her to win several awards, including a Black Movie Award, a Black Reel Award, an NAACP Image Award, and a Young Artist Award.

The film received generally positive reviews from film critics. The review aggregator website Rotten Tomatoes reports an 86% approval rating based on 130 reviews, with an average rating of 7.1/10. The site's critical consensus reads, "A warm, family-friendly underdog story, featuring terrific supporting performances from Keke Palmer, Laurence Fishburne, and Angela Bassett". On Metacritic, the film has an average weighted score of 72 out 100, based on 30 critics, indicating "generally favorable" reviews. CinemaScore reported that audiences gave the film a rare average grade of "A+"—a feat only 52 films reached between 1982 and 2011. National Board of Review elected it among the best ten independent films produced in 2006. Additionally, two film critics, Chris Kaltenbach of The Baltimore Sun and Carrie Rickey of The Philadelphia Inquirer, added the film on their list of the ten best films of the year. St. Petersburg Times's Steve Persall elected it the best family film of 2006. African American Literature Book Club elected it as the best black film of 2006, as well as chose Fishburne as the second best actor, and Palmer and Basset as the second and eighth best actresses, respectively.

Roger Ebert of the Chicago Sun-Times wrote it is "an uncommonly good movie, entertaining and actually inspirational". Writing for Film Journal International, Doris Toumarkine praised its pace and how "Atchison takes spelling competitions and conveys the excitement of the 'sport,' the appeal of the 'game,' the thrill of the win, [and] the crushing blow of the loss". Hornaday from The Washington Post called the film "a triumph on many levels" and especially appreciated that South Los Angeles was presented without stereotypes. Jane Clifford of U-T San Diego felt the film would appeal to both children and adults, and stated that every time she tried to predict its plot "it took a sharp turn. A turn that leaves you facing your stereotypes and feeling a little sheepish". Dana Stevens, writing for The New York Times, asserted, "The innate suspense and charm of the spelling bee", and "a trio of crack performances" can turn "a formulaic sports picture" into a "tale that manages to inspire without being sappy". Shantayaé Grant of The Jamaica Observer wrote that "acting is spectacular, the emotions are real and this story of black triumph is simply phenomenal". A New York Press critic affirmed that Akeelah and the Bee "resurrects a nearly lost idea of what an art-movie really is" because it has "dramatic attention to character and place, psychology and existence".

Chang of Variety commented that it "plays like The Karate Kid with a pro-literacy agenda, pushing all the right emotional buttons yet hitting quite a few wrong ones in the process". The Evening Chronicle's review said it "conceals few narrative surprises" but contended that Atchison is also able to "defy our expectations". Turan of the Los Angeles Times criticized that the film "telegraphs its plot"; however, he praised it as "genuinely sweet and determinedly inspirational". PopMatters's Cynthia Fuchs stated it is formulaic as it has some "conventions that make so many other genre films feel stale", but that it "torques them slightly", emphasizing the "intellectual activities" Akeelah gets involved with. Furthermore, the film was described as "derivatively entertaining in a feel-good sort of way" by Rick Groen in an article for The Globe and Mail. Ingman of The Austin Chronicle described it as a typical sports film and felt it was heavy-handed at times. However, she praised it for its themes and called the film a "thoughtful, engaging" one and said it has a "cross-gender appeal". Morris of The Boston Globe argued, "If Akeelah and the Bee is a generic, well-oiled commercial contraption, it is the first to credibly dramatize the plight of a truly gifted, poor black child". Morris added, "Obviously, it's emotional propaganda. But it's just the kind of propaganda our children need".

Other reactions were more mixed. Anna Smith of Empire called it "formulaic and all-American", commenting that many scenes "appear functional rather than inspirational", and that the film focused on the racial issue "a little too heavily". Smith stated, "clunky plotting and characterisation mean it has 'telemovie' written all over it". Marc Mohan from The Oregonian stressed it can be compared to after-school specials due to its "lack of originality in plot and character". Time Out's Jessica Winter also drew a comparation to after-school specials, saying "on the big screen ... its clichés seem bigger and its characterisations broader than they would on the more forgiving telly". Nick Schager of Slant Magazine lamented that the "clichés are too numerous to mention", while Neil Smith from BBC asserted it has "as much ... fantasy as The Lord of the Rings". Jan Stuart of Newsday deemed it "virtually suspense-free", while Robert Hanks of The Independent stated it has an important message but that is a "shame it couldn't be encased in a less faked-up story". Commenting on The Times, Chris Ayres stressed that although it has good "visual flair" it "is ruined by its Oprah-style emotional manipulation".

In spite of criticism, cast members' performances were usually well received; in particular, Palmer's portrayal of Akeelah. Ebert said, "The movie depends on her, and she deserves its trust". Hornaday opined that "Palmer's Akeelah is that cinematic rara avis, the kid who is cute without being too cute, sympathetic without being cloying, and believable without being tiresome". Evening Chronicle stated Palmer does it "with effortless grace" and that she "carries the film and doesn't strike a single wrong emotional note". Fuchs felt that most of the film's strengths "have to do with Palmer's winning performance". Ingman declared Atchison's "ensemble is wonderful, and his star, Palmer, is a fantastically assured young actress who conveys Akeelah's maelstrom of 11-year-old feelings with no apparent effort". Turan complimented how Fishburne and Bassett's "presence and ability give this film a welcome integrity". Mohan stated, "Although Fishburne and Bassett can do these roles in their sleep, the kids are actually quite engaging". Tourmakine felt there were "fine performances all around" and that Fishburne and Bassett "lend fine support in utterly believable roles".

==== Racial issues ====
Chang called Dylan's father "a stiff Asian stereotype", while Mohan of The Oregonian found it contradictory for an anti-racist film to contain such depiction. Peter Bradshaw of The Guardian even claimed that the line "If you can barely beat a little black girl" (spoken by Dylan's father) signifies that Atchison "thinks it's all right to bring in racism by making the Asians the racists". Metro Silicon Valley's Richard von Busack commented that "stepping around black stereotypes, the film squishes its two left feet right in the mire of Asian stereotyping". Beth Accomando of KPBS also criticized Dylan and his father's portrayal as "painful cliches", while Schager of Slant Magazine found it not authentic, even likening Dylan's father "dictatorial" style to Mao Zedong.

Scholars Charise Pimentel and Cathleen Sawyer from the Texas State University published an article titled "Akeelah and the Bee: Inspirational Story of African-American Intellect and Triumph or Racist Rhetoric Served Up On Another Platter?" on the May 2011 issue of journal Multicultural Perspectives. On a critical discourse analysis, the authors argue that despite appearing to be an "innocent enough" film, it has major approaches that make it racist. First, it implies that African-Americans need to be rescued by others; second, depicts African-American communities as "marked by homelessness, poverty, criminality, unemployment, and remnants of gang activity"; third, indicates that black people usually only achieve success through sports by "linking the very essence of Akeelah's phenomenal ability to spell to her rhythmic abilities"; and shows that African-Americans only can succeed outside their communities, "far from the oppressive clutches of their own".

Linder, on her September 2011 paper "Spelling Out Racial Difference: Moving Beyond the Inspirational Discourses in Akeelah and the Bee", also criticized it saying the film "acts as a platform for a racial melodrama through which ideals of whiteness are reinforced and strengthened". Using Linda Williams' categories of what constitutes a racial melodrama, Linder argues that it is described as an "inspirational" film because of "[its] portrayal of Akeelah's victimization by the black community that surrounds her" and of redemption only achieved "through the idealized discourse of young people's educational success as defined by dominant (white) culture". Linder said characters "are mostly represented as having 'no interest in escape' from societal oppressions and limitations" and that "there is no sign throughout the film of any kind of lasting change for Akeelah's school or her young peers".

Linder affirms that it creates a dichotomy between "success (whiteness) versus failure (blackness)". Pimentel and Sawyer, as well as Linder, identify Larabee as the one who makes this separation clear when he manifests his disregard of African American Vernacular English. The co-authors wrote that Larabee implies that "legitimate forms of intelligence can only be achieved through a Eurocentric perspective, thus advancing the message that Akeelah must be rescued from her African-American ways of knowing, in order to be considered intellectual". Another contraposition commented by scholars was "between the supportive Dr. Larabee and Akeelah's skeptical mother". Pimental and Sawyer said she is portrayed as "an African-American obstructionist", while scholar Gloria Ladson-Billings asserted she represents the stereotype of "ignorant Black woman". Although Fuchs said the film was able to avoid the "white authority figure saves the underclass child" plotline by introducing Larabee, Ladson-Billings, Linder, and Pimentel and Sawyer opined that it did not. After all, Larabee, as Linder described, is "a non-threatening black man who has assimilated to white culture and who can be depended on to help assimilate others".

=== Accolades ===
The film was nominated for six Black Reel Awards, winning only Best Actress for Palmer. Out of five NAACP Image Awards nominations, Akeelah and the Bee won Outstanding Actress in a Motion Picture and Outstanding Writing in a Feature Film/Television Movie – Comedy or Drama. At the Black Movie Awards, it won the five awards it was nominated for. The same happened during the Young Artist Awards where it was nominated for two categories and won two awards, and at the CAMIE Awards where it was nominated for and won an award. The film was also nominated for but did not win any award from the BET Awards, Broadcast Film Critics Association Awards, Chicago Film Critics, and Satellite Awards.

List of awards and nominations
Award	Category	Recipients (Note: When this space is blank it indicates that the film itself was the recipient.)	Result
BET Awards	Best Actress	Angela Bassett	Nominated
Black Movie Awards	Outstanding Motion Picture		Won
Black Movie Awards	Outstanding Actress in a Motion Picture	Keke Palmer	Won
Black Movie Awards	Outstanding Supporting Actor in a Motion Picture	Laurence Fishburne	Won
Black Movie Awards	Outstanding Supporting Actress in a Motion Picture	Angela Bassett	Won
Black Reel Awards	Best Film		Nominated
Black Reel Awards	Best Actress	Keke Palmer	Won
Black Reel Awards	Best Supporting Actress	Angela Bassett	Nominated
Black Reel Awards	Best Supporting Actor	Laurence Fishburne	Nominated
Black Reel Awards	Best Original Score	Aaron Zigman	Nominated
Black Reel Awards	Best Breakthrough Performance	Keke Palmer	Nominated
Broadcast Film Critics Association Awards	Best Family Film (Live Action)		Nominated
Broadcast Film Critics Association Awards	Best Younger Actress	Keke Palmer	Nominated
CAMIE Awards	CAMIE Award	Sean Michael Afable	Won
Chicago Film Critics Association Awards	Most Promising Newcomer	Keke Palmer	Nominated
NAACP Image Awards	Outstanding Motion Picture		Nominated
NAACP Image Awards	Outstanding Actress in a Motion Picture	Keke Palmer	Won
NAACP Image Awards	Outstanding Supporting Actress in a Motion Picture	Angela Bassett	Nominated
NAACP Image Awards	Outstanding Supporting Actor in a Motion Picture	Laurence Fishburne	Nominated
NAACP Image Awards	Outstanding Writing in a Feature Film/Television Movie – Comedy or Drama	Doug Atchison	Won
National Board of Review Awards	Top Ten Independent Films		Won
Satellite Awards	Outstanding Youth DVD		Nominated
Young Artist Awards	Best Performance in a Feature Film – Leading Young Actress	Keke Palmer	Won
Young Artist Awards	Best Family Feature Film (Drama)		Won

== Works cited ==
- "Akeelah and the Bee Production Notes" (PDF). HollywoodJesus.com. Archived from the original (PDF) on May 7, 2013.
- Beck, Bernard (2009). "Angels With Dirty Faces: Who Invited Slumdog Millionaire and The Visitor?". Multicultural Perspectives. 11 (3): 146–149. doi:10.1080/15210960903116589. S2CID 144128792.
- Ladson-Billings, Gloria (2009). "'Who you callin' nappy-headed?' A critical race theory look at the construction of Black women". Race Ethnicity and Education. 12 (1). Routledge: 87–99. doi:10.1080/13613320802651012. S2CID 143448010.
- Linder, Kathryn (September 2011). "Spelling Out Racial Difference: Moving Beyond the Inspirational Discourses in Akeelah and the Bee" (PDF). Red Feather Journal. 2 (2): 18–33. Archived from the original (PDF) on March 4, 2016.
- Niemiec, Ryan M; Wedding, Danny (2013). Positive Psychology at the Movies: Using Films to Build Virtues and Character Strengths. Hogrefe Publishing. ISBN 978-1-61676-443-2.
- Pimentel, Charise; Sawyer, Cathleen (May 2011). "Akeelah and the Bee: Inspirational Story of African-American Intellect and Triumph or Racist Rhetoric Served Up On Another Platter?". Multicultural Perspectives. 13 (2). National Association for Multicultural Education: 100–104. doi:10.1080/15210960.2011.571559. S2CID 17731813.
