= Throw under the bus =

Idiomatic phrase in English

A sign refers to this phrase at Support Event: Victoria

To "throw (someone) under the bus" is an idiomatic phrase in English meaning to blame or abandon a person for selfish reasons. It is typically used to describe a disavowal of a previously amicable relationship to avoid being associated with something controversial or embarrassing.

== Origins ==
The expression "throw/push/shove someone under the bus" was first documented in Britain around the late 1970s and early 1980s. The earliest known usage of this phrase was 21 June 1982, when Julian Critchley of The Times (London) wrote "President Galtieri had pushed her under the bus which the gossips had said was the only means of her removal."

After Julian Critchley, a relatively early use is attributed by the website Double-Tongued Dictionary to a 1991 article in the Colorado Springs Gazette-Telegraph.

Cyndi Lauper is sometimes wrongly quoted as saying in The Washington Post in 1984: "In the rock 'n' roll business, you are either on the bus or under it. Playing 'Feelings' with Eddie and the Condos in a buffet bar in Butte is under the bus." However, those lines were written by journalist David Remnick in an article about Lauper, but they are not attributed in the article to her or anyone else.

== Use in 2008 US political discourse ==
The phrase was picked up by the US media during the 2008 political primary season. It has frequently been used to describe various politicians distancing themselves from suddenly unpopular or controversial figures with whom the candidate has previously allied themselves. David Segal, a writer for The Washington Post, called the expression "the cliché of the 2008 campaign". In a March 2008 NPR report, the linguist Geoff Nunberg noted that the expression "has appeared in more than 400 press stories on the campaign over the last six months".

== See also ==
- Betrayal
- Fall guy
- Scapegoating
- Throw to the wolves
