= Pan Am (TV series) =

American television drama series, 2011–2012

- Genre: Period drama; Historical fiction
- Created by: Jack Orman
- Developed by: Nancy Hult Ganis
- Starring: Christina Ricci; Margot Robbie; Michael Mosley; Karine Vanasse; Mike Vogel; Kelli Garner
- Composer: Blake Neely
- Country of origin: United States
- Original language: English
- No. of seasons: 1
- No. of episodes: 14

Production
- Executive producers: Nancy Hult Ganis; Jack Orman; Thomas Schlamme; Steven Maeda; Sid Ganis
- Producers: Rebecca Moline; Marta Gene Camps; Toby Conroy; Iain Peterson; Mike Daniels; Paul Kurta (pilot only)
- Cinematography: John Lindley; Ron Fortunato
- Editors: Rob Seidenglanz; Gregg Featherman; Kevin Casey
- Camera setup: Single-camera
- Running time: 43 minutes
- Production companies: Jack Orman Productions; Out of the Blue Entertainment; Shoe Money Productions; Sony Pictures Television

Original release
- Network: ABC
- Release: September 25, 2011 – February 19, 2012

Pan Am is an American period drama television series created by writer Jack Orman. Named for the iconic Pan American World Airways, the series features the aircraft pilots and stewardesses of the fictional Pan Am Clipper Majestic, operating in the early 1960s at the beginning of the commercial Jet Age. The show stars Christina Ricci, Margot Robbie, Karine Vanasse, and Kelli Garner as the crew's stewardesses, and Michael Mosley and Mike Vogel as the pilots.

Pan Am premiered on ABC on September 25, 2011, and ended on February 19, 2012. ABC canceled the series on May 11, 2012. That same month, Sony Pictures Television had conversations with Amazon about picking up the series for a second season because of its critical success internationally, having won Best Series at the Rose d'Or TV awards. Unable to reach a deal with Amazon, the producers officially ended the series on June 20, 2012.

== Cast and characters ==
=== Main ===
- Christina Ricci as Margaret "Maggie" Ryan, the flight crew's idealistic and liberal-minded purser, who is not afraid to test the rules and her Pan Am superiors. From Tacoma, Washington, Maggie worked as a waitress in a seedy diner after dropping out of college during her freshman year. She joined Pan Am by creating the impression she was fluent in Portuguese because her former employer was from Brazil.
- Margot Robbie as Laura Cameron, a stewardess newly out of training, and Kate Cameron's younger sister. Laura appears on the cover of Life magazine in her Pan Am uniform, making her a minor celebrity and a source of irritation for her older sister. Having run away from her own wedding in New Haven, Connecticut, several months prior, she struggles to grow up and prove to her sister she can stand on her own two feet. Although her face is not seen, Robbie briefly reprises the role of Laura on a Pan Am flight serving a cocktail, in Quentin Tarantino's Once Upon a Time in Hollywood, in which she also plays actress Sharon Tate.
- Michael Mosley as Ted Vanderway, the crew's first officer (co-pilot). A former United States Naval Aviator and test pilot, he was honorably discharged from the navy after a naval tribunal blamed him for the crash of an aircraft he was piloting even though his father (whose company manufactured the aircraft) admits to Ted in private that there was a mechanical problem. Though he is engaged to his childhood friend Amanda, Ted slowly develops a relationship with Laura.
- Karine Vanasse as Colette Valois, a French Pan Am stewardess. Orphaned during the German occupation of France during World War II, she still harbors resentment toward the German people. It is later revealed that her parents were French Jews who had been killed at Dachau shortly after she was left at an orphanage. Furthermore, she has a brother who was placed for adoption; by the end of the series, Colette plans to search for him.
- Mike Vogel as Dean Lowrey, a Boeing 707 pilot recently promoted to captain on Pan Am's international routes and one of the youngest airline captains in the industry. A former Air Force pilot, he had been romantically involved with the crew's former purser, Bridget, and is now pursuing a relationship with Colette. Dean also finds himself in a secret relationship with Ginny, the mistress of a Pan Am vice president.
- Kelli Garner as Catherine "Kate" Cameron, an experienced, trilingual stewardess and Laura Cameron's older, head-strong sister. During the pilot episode, Kate is recruited by the CIA and starts taking early assignments as a covert operative. She demonstrates a flair for espionage that impresses her handlers. In the final episode, she is offered a promotion from courier to agent.

=== Recurring ===
- David Harbour as Roger Anderson, a British MI6 agent and Kate's covert intelligence operations contact in London. It is revealed in the series finale that Anderson is a double agent for the KGB.
- Jeremy Davidson as Richard Parks, Kate's CIA handler and mentor, based in New York. In the series finale, he recommends that Kate be sent to Langley for training as one of the CIA's first female field officers.
- Annabelle Wallis as Bridget Pierce, an English stewardess and former Pan Am purser. She was dating Dean Lowrey before she resigned from Pan Am and vacated her flat in London following her deactivation as an MI6 courier. She recommends that Richard recruit Kate into the CIA as a courier. After Kate kills the intelligence dealer who was planning to sell a list of CIA/MI6 assets, Bridget reclaims her job at Pan Am and hopes to reclaim Dean as well.
- Goran Visnjic as Niko Lonza, a Yugoslavian diplomat attached to the United Nations, serving in the United States. He becomes involved with Kate, and finds himself torn between his love of his homeland and the advantages of his new country. Visnjic appeared in a three-episode arc beginning with the series' fifth episode.
- Scott Cohen as Everett Henson, a Pan Am vice president whose mistress, Ginny, has a secret affair with Dean.
- Chris Beetem as Congressman Christopher Rawlings, a Republican congressman who carries on a brief affair with Maggie, despite their political differences; Rawlings is a right-wing conservative and Maggie is a left-wing liberal.
- Darren Pettie as Captain George Broyles, a veteran Pan Am pilot who smuggles alcohol and tobacco on the side during his flights. Despite being punched in the face by Dean for this activity, he lures Maggie into becoming his business partner. He also saves Dean from termination by giving the investigating board an endorsement from Juan Trippe.
- Kal Parekh as Sanjeev, the crew's Indian flight engineer.
- Jay O. Sanders as Douglas Vanderway, Ted's father and president of a major aeronautics corporation. After Ted is discharged from the US Navy, Douglas has Juan Trippe hire him into Pan Am.
- Piter Marek as Omar, a Wahran prince who befriends Colette after boarding a flight to Rome with no money or luggage. On the rebound from her relationship with Dean, Colette accepts Omar's advances and nearly becomes engaged to him; however, he reluctantly breaks things off after Colette consents to a background check which reveals her Jewish heritage (implicitly, something Omar's family would not accept).
- Veanne Cox as Miss Havemeyer, an uptight, authoritarian Pan Am supervisor who is always at odds with Maggie.
- Erin Cummings as Ginny Saddler, a mistress of Pan Am vice president Everett Henson. Without his knowledge, she becomes romantically involved with Dean; however, Maggie exposes their secret affair to Henson. When Dean urges Ginny to end their affair, she takes it hard enough to smash her face through a window in Rome.
- Colin Donnell as Mike Ruskin, a columnist for The Village Voice who befriends Maggie on his trip to Berlin and publishes her scathing article on Congressman Rawlings.
- Ashley Greene as Amanda Mason, Ted's childhood friend and later love interest and fiancée. At a party, she unexpectedly kisses a desolate Maggie. When Ted later confronts Amanda, she admits that she feels more comfortable around women, and Ted refuses her proposal of an open marriage. In the final episode, she reveals she is pregnant.

== Production ==
Sony licensed the rights to use the Pan Am name and logo from Pan Am Systems, a New Hampshire–based railroad company that acquired the Pan Am brand in 1998. Nancy Hult Ganis, a Pan Am stewardess from 1968 to 1976, was one of the show's executive producers and is credited as the series developer; she conducted research for the series at the Pan Am Historical Foundation and at Pan Am's archives at the University of Miami. In addition, Ganis advised the actors, props department, production designers, and costumers in making details for the show as accurate as possible. The program featured the trademark, sky-blue Pan Am uniforms worn by stewardesses. Costume design was overseen by Anne Crabtree, who ensured attention to detail. The department made the replicas based on an old uniform which was thoroughly studied. Twenty craftsmen worked to produce each outfit. The technique was the same used by Pan Am in the sixties, and Crabtree remarked that the process was very "old school." At the time, girdles were mandatory to improve posture; some of the cast members found them "extremely restricting" during filming. Crabtree said that male costumes were inspired by James Dean and Steve McQueen.

Although the series depicts the characters in various cities around the world, the show was filmed at the Brooklyn Navy Yard and other locations around New York City. The pilot was filmed partly at Gold Coast Studios in Bethpage on Long Island. A life-size recreation of a Pan Am 707 jet was used, which Entertainment Weekly magazine stated was "the biggest star of the series—in all senses." The 707 model was kept in a hangar near the Brooklyn waterfront.

The pilot episode cost an estimated $10 million. The series was produced by Sony Pictures Television, and was optioned by ABC in May 2011 for the 2011–2012 schedule. ABC commissioned five more scripts in November 2011. The broadcaster later added a fourteenth episode to the series. In the middle of the season, Steven Maeda was hired as Pan Am's new showrunner, with the mandate to "serialize and embrace the soap aspect" of the show.

In November 2011, there was media speculation that the series had been canceled by ABC, based on a comment from Karine Vanasse about the future of Pan Am and its absence from the mid-season schedule. The network denied the rumors; it planned to complete fourteen episodes and delay any announcement regarding a second season to a later date. The series was canceled on May 11, 2012.

== Promotion ==
The September 12, 2011, edition of TV Guide's Fall Preview issue included an advertisement on the back of the magazine, shown upside-down, featuring Ricci, Garner, Vanasse, and Robbie appearing as their characters for a fictional cover of TV Guide, using the magazine's 1960s logo. Between December 20, 2011, and January 5, 2012, the first nine episodes of the series were made available free of charge on Internet download sites in an effort to increase viewer interest in the series. Canadian Karine Vanasse responded to a question on her Twitter account by saying that the promotion was only available in the United States.

== Episodes ==
No.	Title	Directed by	Written by	Original release date	Prod. code	US viewers (millions)	18–49 rating
1	"Pilot"	Thomas Schlamme	Jack Orman	September 25, 2011	PA-101	11.06	3.1
April 1963. Dean pilots the Clipper Majestic's first New York to London flight—his first as a captain. Maggie, a free-spirited stewardess suspended for not wearing her girdle to work, is unexpectedly reinstated when the scheduled purser, Bridget, does not arrive. Dean remembers asking Bridget to marry him while evacuating CIA-sponsored Cuban exiles from Cuba, who were captured and imprisoned after the Bay of Pigs Invasion. Veteran stewardess Kate is a new CIA courier who was recruited in Rome three months prior. Her first U.S. intelligence assignment is to switch a passenger's passport for an expired one. Meanwhile, Laura does her best on her first flight, and feels self-conscious when people ask if she's the stewardess on the cover of Life magazine. Colette discovers she's the other woman when a former lover boards the flight with his wife and son. In London, Dean seeks out Bridget but discovers she's disappeared from her now-empty apartment. Kate learns her first assignment was a test, which she has passed, and her mark is actually her British intelligence contact, Roger Anderson. She realizes that Bridget was an MI6 courier who arranged Kate's recruitment.
2	"We'll Always Have Paris"	Chris Misiano	Mike Daniels & Jack Orman	October 2, 2011	PA-103	7.76	2.6
During a trip to Paris, Kate and Laura's mother arrives and brings Laura's jilted fiancée. Kate seethes at her mother's favoritism for Laura. Maggie fends off sexual harassment from an aggressive, drunk passenger and is angry when he's not held responsible for his bad behavior. In Paris, Dean enlists Colette's aid as he looks for the missing Bridget but they hit a dead end. Meanwhile, Kate's U.S. intelligence handler, Richard Parks, gives her a small package to deliver in Paris. Kate is surprised when the recipient is Bridget. The package contains a passport and other identification for Bridget's new identity. She warns Kate could lose her whole life if she keeps working in espionage, but Kate doesn't want out. Laura explains to her fiancée that she left him because she didn't want marriage to be her last big adventure, and he understands because he has an unfulfilled dream of climbing Mount Kilimanjaro.
3	"Ich Bin ein Berliner"	Alex Graves	Yahlin Chang	October 9, 2011	PA-104	6.38	1.9
June 1963. On a press junket to West Berlin, Maggie tries everything she can to meet President John F. Kennedy while the crew tries to find a place to see him deliver his Ich bin ein Berliner speech. Meanwhile, Colette struggles with her memories of the Nazi occupation of Paris and being orphaned when she was a child during World War II. While on a covert intelligence operation, Kate aids a female East German intelligence courier who is in hiding from the Stasi and wishes to defect. Near the end of the episode, the crew attends a party at the U.S. State Department's Berlin Mission. In the midst of the festivities surrounding Kennedy's presence there, Colette spontaneously and emotionally sings aloud the first verse of the "Deutschlandlied"— the German national anthem written in 1841 but not fully used today because of the world wars. She later explains to Kate that the US government shouldn't try to erase the German's shame over the war. "I came to Germany to forgive," Colette says, "but I still hate them. And I don't know how to stop."
4	"Eastern Exposure"	Thomas Schlamme	Jack Orman & Moira Walley-Beckett	October 16, 2011	PA-102	5.84	1.8
A last-minute scheduling change lands the crew in Rangoon before heading to Jakarta, Indonesia. While there, Maggie takes Laura out on the town. Anderson gives Kate a covert assignment to deliver a spy camera to a seedy part of the city. She almost misses the drop deadline because Laura unwittingly borrows the camera for her own interests. Meanwhile, Ted is reminded of his past as a United States Naval Aviator and test pilot. He resents his powerful family connections, which landed him his current job with Pan Am after he was honorably discharged from the Navy. After arriving in Hong Kong from Jakarta, Ted punches Dean after a heated disagreement concerning the landing of their aircraft. They settle their differences after returning to New York, where Dean tells Ted how he managed to jump the line. Kate expects to return home and find Laura in the apartment they share in Brooklyn, but the apartment is empty and Laura moves in with Maggie.
5	"One Coin in a Fountain"	Andrew Bernstein	Story by : Lydia Woodward; Teleplay by : Jill Abbinanti & Lydia Woodward	October 23, 2011	PA-105	5.68	1.8
July 1963. The crew flies to Monte Carlo. Maggie is attracted to Niko Lonza (Goran Visnjic), a Yugoslavian UN attaché who has a personal connection to a female Soviet spy, (Barbara Schulz). Kate's assignment is to get the spy's fingerprints, which puts her directly between Niko and Maggie, much to Maggie's consternation. In New York, Laura returns to the pawn shop to retrieve the engagement ring she pawned more than 60 days before, after leaving her groom-to-be at the altar. When she discovers that it has been sold, she goes to Harlem with Ted to find the buyer and repurchase it, as she wants closure with her former fiancé. During an earlier flight between New York and London, Dean meets Ginny (Erin Cummings), a passenger who, as he discovers en route to Monte Carlo, is the mistress of Everett Henson (Scott Cohen), a Pan Am vice president.
6	"The Genuine Article"	Matt Penn	Todd Ellis Kessler & Nick Thiel	October 30, 2011	PA-106	5.46	1.8
August 1963. Despite being very close to losing her job due to insubordination, Maggie is assigned to a flight to Rio de Janeiro because she claims to be fluent in Portuguese. As she reflects on the path she took to get her job, realizes she would do anything to keep it. Meanwhile, Kate learns that the CIA wants her to recruit Niko, and tries to balance work and her growing relationship with him. Dean is annoyed as Ginny continues to romantically vacillate between him and her boss, Mr. Henson. During the flight to Rio de Janeiro, a photographer for Life magazine takes pictures of Laura. During a raid, the police in Rio de Janeiro arrest Laura and Maggie for buying stolen goods. Laura is disappointed to discover Maggie is not fluent in Portuguese. Ted arrives at the police station and bribes the officers to let the women go. Maggie, whose job is still in jeopardy, solicits Henson's help on the flight back to New York, and after their arrival at the Worldport. When he refuses to help her, Maggie informs him about Dean and Ginny. Maggie keeps her job and begins studying Portuguese.
7	"Truth or Dare"	Julie Anne Robinson	Mike Daniels & Jack Orman	November 6, 2011	PA-108	5.17	1.7
The crew is assigned to shuttle U.S. Navy sailors belonging to a submarine crew from Madrid-Barajas Airport to Idlewild Airport. During a game of Truth or Dare, Laura reveals that she posed nude for a Life magazine photographer, which upsets Kate. Once airborne, the sailors hold an impromptu bachelor party for one of their own. Maggie dares Colette to fly the plane, so she convinces Dean to let her briefly take the controls. After landing, Maggie invites Joe (Gaius Charles), a Black sailor from Mississippi, to spend the night on a couch in her and Laura's apartment. The following day, he and Laura tour New York City until his train departs for Mississippi. In the train station, Joe suffers a racially motivated assault. Laura tends to his wounds and they share a passionate kiss. Kate is upset when Niko is forcibly taken for a CIA interview. After realizing Kate has been working to recruit him as an operative, Niko accuses her of also lying about her romantic feelings. Niko and Kate make amends in the Worldport before she boards Flight 2, a flight around the world, and he returns to Yugoslavia.
8	"Unscheduled Departure"	Millicent Shelton	Jill Abbinanti & Nick Thiel	November 13, 2011	PA-109	5.64	1.8
October 1963. En route to Caracas, Flight 203 is diverted to Port-au-Prince when a passenger named Henry (guest star Harris Yulin) appears to suffer a heart attack. At the airport, Colette negotiates with Haitian rebels to use their jeep to find a doctor. Ted and Colette leave on their search and encounter an orphaned girl. She helps them find a doctor, who gives Ted and Colette a nitroglycerin pill for Henry. Colette brings the girl with them, much to Ted’s chagrin. Before they return with the medicine, Henry dies. The runway has been damaged by Hurricane Ginny and is too short for a normal take-off, so the flight lightens its load in any way possible, including leaving Henry's body behind. With armed and hostile Haitian troops approaching, Dean performs a dangerous take-off, and they fly to Miami. Kate asks Richard to ensure the orphan is allowed into the U.S. A Pan Am official confronts the stewardesses about the stowaway, but is thwarted when the crew presents a united front. The Miami base manager tells Dean would be fired if not for Juan Trippe's favor. As Dean leaves the manager's office, Colette gives him a prolonged kiss.
9	"Kiss Kiss Bang Bang"	John Fortenberry	Moira Walley-Beckett & Lydia Woodward	December 4, 2011	PA-110	4.65	1.5
Kate is strongarmed into one last CIA assignment by Anderson. Dean decides to teach Colette how to fly at his parents' farm. She is humiliated to learn Dean didn't tell his parents about his breakup with Bridget, but they work through it and make love in a barn. On a London flight, Laura spills coffee on Dean's obnoxious replacement—the lecherous Dennis Thornton (guest star John Bedford Lloyd). Ted defuses the tension, and asks Laura to pose as his girlfriend during a meeting with his childhood friend, Amanda Mason (Ashley Greene). Ted walks away with Amanda before Laura can participate in the ruse. Maggie's activist friend Sam (Danny Deferrari) confronts hawkish Congressman Christopher Rawlings (Chris Beetem) over nuclear weapons. Maggie sleeps with Rawlings and then burns his pro-nuclear speech, causing a fire, and the hotel is evacuated. Kate and Anderson must obtain a CIA asset list from Cyrus Bolger (Damian Young), a jeweler who will sell it to the Soviets. Because the hotel is evacuated, Bolger returns to his store where Anderson is breaking into the safe. Kate shoots and kills Bolger to save Anderson's life.
10	"Secrets and Lies"	Allison Liddi-Brown	Mike Daniels	January 8, 2012	PA-111	3.96	1.3
A week after the events in London, Bridget aims to reclaim both her Pan Am job and Dean, since the CIA asset list is now safe. Bridget asks Colette to convince the angry Dean to meet with her. Colette agrees, as she feels Dean must put Bridget behind him. Bridget tells Dean the truth about being a spy for MI6 and, though he is still upset, they sleep together. Maggie writes an article for the Village Voice criticizing Congressman Rawlings' politics, but her reporter friend Mike Ruskin (Colin Donnell) rejects it as an angry rant. After having lunch with Rawlings, Maggie falls in love with him. At the last minute, Mike submits Maggie's article for publication, sending her into a panic. Ted wants to sleep with Amanda, but she's waiting for marriage. He consults Laura, who admires girls who want to wait but is not a virgin herself. After Amanda defends Ted against his overbearing father (Jay O. Sanders), Ted asks Laura to help him buy an engagement ring. This makes Laura uncomfortable because she has feelings for Ted. Kate, meanwhile, lies her way through a polygraph test to protect herself and Anderson from the fallout from Bolger's death. She passes the test and is unsure if she wants to stop spying.
11	"Diplomatic Relations"	David Petrarca	Story by : Todd Ellis Kessler; Teleplay by : Jeffrey Lieber & Craig Shapiro	January 15, 2012	PA-112	3.82	1.2
November 1963. After Dean's night with Bridget, he is assigned to pilot the first flight to Moscow. However, Captain George Broyles (Darren Pettie) assumes charge during the crew briefing. Upon landing, Bridget, Colette, Laura, and Kate go sightseeing, but KGB agents interpret Laura's photography as espionage and detain her and Bridget. The Soviet hosts cancel the trip and insist the crew return to the U.S., leaving Laura and Bridget behind. Kate discovers that Broyles is a smuggler, and she successfully gets him to bribe an influential Kremlin official to free Laura and Bridget. On the flight back to New York, Dean tells Colette about his affair with Bridget. Colette is heartbroken, but Bridget is hopeful of a reunion with Dean. Meanwhile, Maggie is Congressman Rawlings' date at a party, which includes Ted and Amanda. When Maggie insults one of Rawlings' largest donors, he realizes she wrote the critical news article about him and breaks up with her. Ted proposes to Amanda and she accepts. Later, Amanda kisses a heartbroken Maggie on the lips.
12	"New Frontiers"	John Fortenberry	Jessica Ramos & Scott Erik Summer	January 22, 2012	PA-113	3.74	1.2
Maggie tells Ted why she has reservations about him marrying Amanda. When Ted confronts Amanda, she asks for an open marriage. Dean pines for Colette, who reveals she has asked for a transfer to the Hong Kong hub. On a flight to Rome, Colette befriends a handsome, mysterious man named Omar (Piter Marek) and agrees to show him around the city. Meanwhile, Dean is accosted by local customs officials who are looking for a smuggler. Dean points out Omar, who turns out to be a runaway prince from Wahran. Kate needs to learn how to pickpocket for her next mission: stealing a microfilm from a diplomat. Laura discover that the Life magazine photographer, Graham, sold her nude photos to a gallery, where they are displayed and are eventually bought by Andy Warhol, who is interested in meeting Laura. Dean realizes that Broyles, who was on the flight to Rome, was smuggling cigarettes, and punches him during a party. At the end, everyone's lives are interrupted when they learn about the assassination of John F. Kennedy.
13	"Romance Languages"	John Coles	Moira Walley-Beckett	February 12, 2012	PA-107	2.57	0.7
The Clipper Majestic crew fly to Rome and Dean decides to end his relationship with Ginny, who is still the mistress of a Pan Am executive. She is devastated when Dean breaks up with her. Meanwhile, Colette looks after an unescorted 12-year-old boy named Charlie, who develops a crush on her. Kate is still in love with Niko. When She arrives in Rome, a strange man pushes her to the ground and tells her to stay away from Niko. Laura spends her time in Rome trying to convince everyone, especially herself, that she is not a child because of the Life magazine article about her and her argument with the photographer. Laura and Kate talk about their first sexual experiences and experiencing the world in Rome. When Laura returns to New York, she does not sleep with the photographer but allows him to take nude photographs of her. Ginny tells Colette that someone revealed Ginny's affair with Dean, and Colette works out that it was Maggie, whom she confronts. Colette does not tell Dean because he didn't want to know. Note: The narrative of this episode takes place between "The Genuine Article" and "Truth or Dare." "Romance Languages" had originally been scheduled to air on November 6, 2011 (one week after "The Genuine Article"), but ABC instead aired "Truth or Dare" on that date. ABC aired "Romance Languages" three months later, opposite the Grammy Awards, with no in-story explanation for the out-of-order action.
14	"1964"	Andrew Bernstein	Nick Thiel	February 19, 2012	PA-114	3.77	1.2
Dean may be fired, pending an investigation into the incident in Haiti. Broyles convinces Maggie to smuggle jewels through customs. Because she speaks Portuguese, she is able to negotiate a fair price for the jewels. Broyles presents an endorsement for Dean from Juan Trippe, which Maggie obtained. As a result, Dean is only suspended for six months. Omar wishes to court Colette, but withdraws his suit when a it's revealed that, unknown to her, Colette's parents were Jewish and killed at Dachau. Colette learns that she has a younger brother who was given up for adoption. In New York, an injured Richard tells Kate that a double agent is trying to obtain the microfilm. However, Anderson claims Richard is the double agent and Kate must figure out which one she trusts. Ted breaks off his engagement, tells Laura he loves her, and they kiss. Amanda tells Ted she is pregnant. As the episode (and series) draws to a close, the entire crew of the Clipper Majestic celebrate the New Year by watching the Times Square Ball drop from Ted's apartment. Colette reconciles with Dean and they share a kiss at the stroke of midnight.

== Broadcast ==
The series aired in Canada on CTV on the same night as the ABC broadcasts, but was shown in different time slots by region. It also aired on CTV's sister cable channel Bravo! on Saturdays. The series premiered in Brazil and Panama on Sony Entertainment Television on March 18, 2012. In Costa Rica the channel Teletica aired Pan Am on October 15, 2012.

In Ireland, the show premiered on RTÉ Two on October 17. The series premiered in the United Kingdom on BBC Two on November 16, 2011. The BBC suspended its broadcast after eight episodes and stated that further episodes would return on January 28, 2012. Canal+ began broadcasting the series in Spain on October 29, 2011. The series premiered in Sweden on TV3 on October 16, 2011. On November 6, 2011, the series premiered on SIC in Portugal. On December 26, 2011, the series premiered in the Netherlands on NET 5. In Australia the series was broadcast on the Nine Network in 2012. In the Flemish part of Belgium, the airing started on Vijf on February 15, 2012., In the French part of Belgium the airing started on BeTV on May 7, 2012. In Finland the show premiered in January 2012 on Yle TV2. In Denmark, Pan Am was aired on TV3 (Danmark), TV3 Puls & TV3+ (Denmark). In Catalonia, TV3 started broadcasting the series on February 10, 2013.

In South East Asia, the channel beTV (a Sony Pictures Entertainment Networks Asia, SPENA television) airs the TV Show from February 4, 2012, every Saturday at 9:00 p.m. It started airing on STAR World India from February 11, 2012. In New Zealand the show premiered on November 24, 2012 with TVNZ, which rescheduled episode "Romance Languages" into chronological order to maintain series flow. It was shown every Saturday at 9:35pm on their TV One channel before being moved to a later time slot after episode 9 due to lower than expected viewing numbers.

== Reception ==
=== Critical and industry reception ===
The show was given a 67 out of 100 on Metacritic based on 28 reviews, indicating generally favorable reception. Heather Hogan of AfterEllen rated the show highly, saying, "I continue to be impressed by the unapologetic way Pan Am pushes the women to the forefront of every story ... I don't think Pan Am really knows what kind of show it wants to be just yet. But I also don't think that's a problem because every variation—Cold War drama, nostalgic soap opera, feminist dramady—has something to offer." Later episodes, however, received lower reviews for the loss of focus on the women and the addition of romantic storylines. Matthew Gilbert of The Boston Globe gave the show a "B" grade, commenting, "Next to The Playboy Club it's the better network 1960s drama. The romance and the attractively stylized innocence of the era is addictive, but the espionage plot, with its link to political history, is absurd. And the female empowerment message grows feeble." The Insider included Pan Am in its list of "10 Best New Fall TV Shows."

Media coverage has noted that no major characters smoke, although the practice was common on flights and in the terminal during the 1960s. ABC and its parent Disney banned tobacco use by the show's stars. Citing "an enormous impressionable element," Thomas Schlamme called the anachronism "the one revisionist cheat," and said he had encountered a similar restriction directing a previous show for ABC. Other characters can be seen holding cigarettes in the background.

In the UK, Melissa Whitworth of The Daily Telegraph said that Pan Am chose to "airbrush" the sixties because it depicts a "romanticised" view of the period. Colin Kennedy and Sharon Lougher of the Metro said the series is "irritatingly in love with its own sense of style," though they said the storylines made it a "soapy guilty pleasure" and included it in their "pick of the day" television feature. Euan Ferguson from The Guardian praised Ricci's casting as a positive indicator of the quality of acting, but criticized the overall casting, saying similar looks and identical uniforms make it difficult for viewers to learn the characters. Emma Brockes from the Guardian said that Pan Am is "bubble gum bright" and praised the whole cast for putting in "strong performances." In Ireland, Pat Stacey of the Evening Herald said the series portrays "silly storylines" and "cheesy dialogue," calling it "mile-high mediocrity."

Scott McCartney of The Wall Street Journal noted that the show highlights the "elegance and excitement" of air travel during the early 1960s. He said that former employees of the airline thought the series is an accurate portrayal, aside from some "Hollywood glamorization."

The Association of Flight Attendants (CWA, the world's largest flight attendants' union) released a statement following the premiere of Pan Am. It said that the show is a reminder of the progress of flight attendants in relation to previous social injustices:

The premiere episode of the new Pan Am drama on ABC may be a nostalgic escape to the days before deregulation, but it also highlighted the myriad of social injustices overcome by the strong women who shaped a new career. Weight checks, girdle checks, the no marriage rule, sexism, gender discrimination, racism—all of this was challenged by intelligent, visionary women who helped to usher in the call for social change throughout the country and around the world.

As union members, the generation that crewed 1960s Pan American World Airways and their other airline counterparts, Flight Attendants fortified their voice to press airline management and Capitol Hill for equal rights, recognition of their work and improved aviation health and safety standards that benefit the traveling public. Negotiating contract improvements for middle-class pay, proper rest, health care and retirement benefits ensured the skilled "stewardesses" set career standards that provided new opportunities for all women and men...

About the show's demise, Christina Ricci said, "I think it should not have been on network television. I think if that had been [on] a cable show or streaming, they would’ve been able to do so much more. Making a show about that period of time and having to be so PC, it doesn’t make sense, because there’s no substance there." But she is still very proud of the show, saying, "It was beautiful. It was really well made."

=== Viewership ===
The series premiere attracted 11.06 million viewers, but viewership declined thereafter. The second episode attracted 7.76 million, and by the sixth episode, ratings were less than half of the show's premiere. By the season's 12th episode, audiences had fallen to 3.74 million.

Following ABC's announcement of its mid-season schedule in November 2011, TV by the Numbers called Pan Am "defacto canceled" given its ratings and the fact that ABC had ordered only one further episode. A tweet by cast member Karine Vanasse ("Well, we received THE call, #PanAm is only coming back for one more episode after Christmas. But up to the end, we'll give it our all!") appeared to confirm the cancellation, though weeks later Vanasse told The Hollywood Reporter, "What I was saying is that we would come back to shoot one more episode after Christmas." In a Los Angeles Times interview published just before the series finale, showrunner Steven Maeda said that Pan Am has a "good upscale core of viewers" both live and DVR; the series finale "tie[s] up some loose ends but ... also add[s] some new threads in there to explore later. But, should [the show] not get picked up, it's a sendoff to the show viewers will be happy with."

=== Awards and accolades ===
In 2012, the show's cinematographer John Lindley earned a nomination for Outstanding Achievement in Cinematography in One-Hour Episodic/Pilot Television by the American Society of Cinematographers. Pan Am's pilot episode was nominated for Best One-Hour Single Camera Television Series at the ADG Excellence in Production Design Awards. The series received recognition from gay critics with a Dorian Award nomination for Unsung TV Show of the Year. In May 2012, Pan Am won the Golden Rose Award for Best Series at the international Rose d'Or TV awards, beating Martina Cole's The Runaway and The Jury.

== Home media ==
The complete-series DVD was released on January 29, 2013 through Sony Pictures Home Entertainment. Mill Creek Entertainment re-released that format on August 13, 2019. The set was also made available in the United Kingdom on March 4, 2013, in Germany on June 20, 2013, and in Australia on January 3, 2018.

== See also ==
- Come Fly with Me
