= Katy Lederer =

American poet

- Born: 1971 or 1972 (age c. 53)
- Occupation: Author, poet
- Education: University of California, Berkeley (BA)
- Genre: Poetry, autobiography
- Children: 2
- Relatives: Richard Lederer (father); Howard Lederer (brother); Annie Duke (sister)

Website
- Official website

Katherine "Katy" Lederer (born 1971 or 1972) is an American poet and author of the memoir Poker Face: A Girlhood Among Gamblers.

== Early life and education ==
Lederer is the daughter of bestselling non-fiction author Richard Lederer and Rhoda (née Spangenberg) Lederer. The child of a Jewish father and a non-Jewish mother, she was not raised as Jewish.

Her siblings are world-class poker players Howard Lederer and Annie Duke. She graduated from St. Paul's School in Concord, New Hampshire, where her father was on the English faculty.

Lederer later attended the University of California at Berkeley, from which she received her BA in English and anthropology. After graduating in 1995, Lederer moved to Las Vegas to study poker with her siblings, and was subsequently accepted to the Iowa Writers' Workshop on an Iowa Arts Fellowship. While at Iowa, Lederer founded the zine Explosive, which was published in a limited edition of 300 with hand-printed covers by the artist and writer David Larsen. The tenth and final issue of Explosive was published in 2006.

== Career ==
After completing her studies at Iowa in 1998, Lederer moved to New York City, where she worked for psychoanalyst Arnold Cooper. After this, she worked as a coordinator of the Barnard New Women Poets program. From 1998-1999, she was the editor of the Poetry Project Newsletter out of the Poetry Project at St. Mark’s Church in the Bowery. Lederer continues to publish limited-edition books and chapbooks under the Spectacular Books imprint, and also serves as a Poetry Editor of Fence magazine. In 1999, she signed a contract with Crown Books to write a memoir about her family’s life in gambling, Poker Face: A Girlhood Among Gamblers.

Lederer made her poetry debut in 2002 with the collection Winter Sex. Poet D. A. Powell described the poems in the collection “as leaps of faith, fibrillating in the dark world with a kinetic energy that rises out of erotic desire.” Her memoir, Poker Face: A Girlhood Among Gamblers was published in 2003. It was chosen as a Barnes & Noble Discover Great New Writers selection, and was named a Best Nonfiction Book of the Year by Publishers Weekly and one of eight Best Books of the Year by Esquire Magazine.

From 2002 to 2008, Lederer worked as a recruiter at D.E. Shaw & Co., a quantitative hedge fund in midtown Manhattan, which provided much of the inspiration for the pieces in her most recent poetry collection, The Heaven-Sent Leaf. The title of both the book and the opening poem is taken from the second half of Goethe’s Faust and describes paper money. Other poems in the collection reference the works of John Kenneth Galbraith, Nietzsche, and Edith Wharton.

She married Ben Statz, after being introduced to him by her sister Annie Duke. They have two children.

== Bibliography ==
- Winter Sex (2002). ISBN 0-9703672-8-7
- Poker Face: A Girlhood Among Gamblers (2003). ISBN 1-4000-5276-9
- The Heaven-Sent Leaf (2008). ISBN 978-1-934414-15-6
- The Engineers (2023). ISBN 9781947817609
