= KBPS =

KBPS or kbps may refer to

- kbps (unit), data rate unit usually corresponding to kilobits per second
- kBps or kilobytes per second
- KBPS (AM), radio station (1450 AM) licensed to Portland, Oregon, United States
- KBPS-FM, radio station (89.9 FM) licensed to Portland, Oregon, United States, currently known as KQAC

== See also ==
- KPBS (disambiguation)
