= Sid Ganis =

American film producer (born 1940)

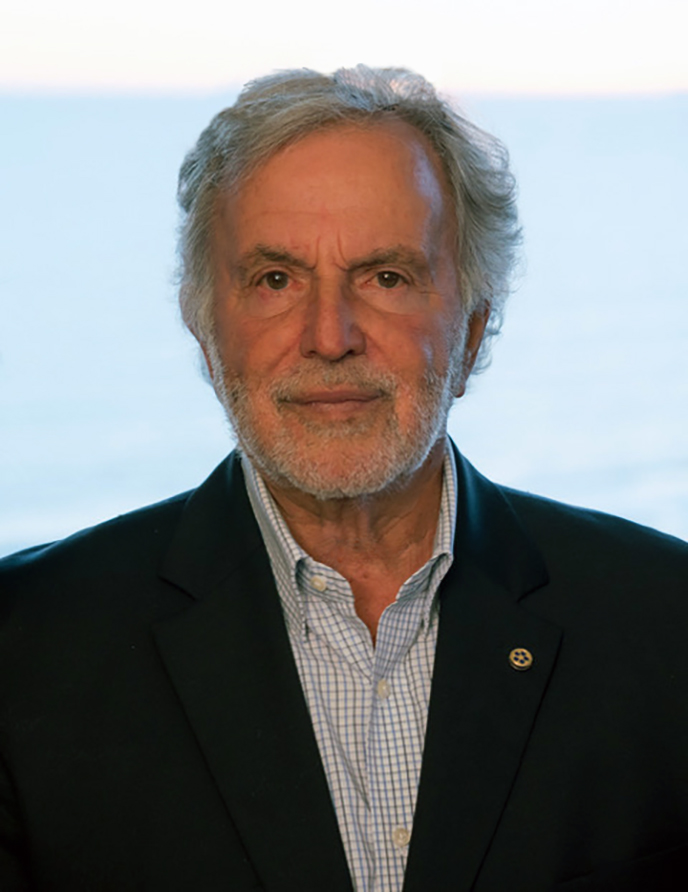
- Ganis in 2018
- Born: Sidney Ganis; January 8, 1940 (age 86); New York City, U.S
- Years active: 1959–present
- Awards: Outstanding Informational Special; 1982 The Making of Raiders of the Lost Ark

Sidney Ganis (born January 8, 1940) is an American motion picture executive and producer. He co-founded Out of the Blue Entertainment with his wife and business partner, Nancy Hult-Ganis, in 1996 following a distinguished career as a studio executive at Sony Pictures, Lucasfilm, Warner Bros., Paramount (where he served as President of the Motion Picture Group), and Columbia Pictures (where he was Vice Chairman).

On August 23, 2005, Ganis was elected President of the Academy of Motion Picture Arts and Sciences, serving a total of four consecutive one–year terms. As a Producer, he achieved box office and critical success with several films and documentaries, including Akeelah and the Bee, which he co-produced with Nancy.

Ganis also served for a decade on the board of Marvel Entertainment until its sale to Disney in 2009, and has held board positions with Film Independent, SF FILM, and the Berkeley Art Museum/Pacific Film Archive (Bay Area).

He currently serves as a trustee of The Academy Museum of Motion Pictures and SF Jazz in San Francisco.

== Early life ==
Ganis was born in Brooklyn, New York. He is of Greek Jewish descent, from the city of Ioannina, in northwest Greece.

== Career ==
Ganis was introduced to the world of entertainment when he worked as an office boy for theatrical publicists Lee Solters and Harvey Sabinson. This led him to a film career in marketing and publicity at several studios, including 20th Century Fox, Columbia Pictures, Seven Arts and Warner Bros. He eventually joined Lucasfilm, where he served as Senior Vice President for several years. There he was responsible for marketing The Empire Strikes Back, Return of the Jedi and the first two installments of the Indiana Jones tetralogy.

In 1986, Ganis joined Paramount Pictures and eventually would become president of the Motion Picture Group, where he helped launch Top Gun and Fatal Attraction. As president, he oversaw the development and production of the worldwide hit Ghost, and bought the underlying rights to Forrest Gump, which would go on to become one of Paramount's biggest hits—both financially and critically—of all time.

After leaving Paramount in 1990, Ganis became president of marketing and distribution at Columbia Pictures. He was eventually made vice chairman of the studio. In 1996, he stepped down to produce via his independent production company, Out of the Blue... Entertainment. Under this company, Ganis co-executive produced ABC's Pan Am (2011–12) along with his wife, Nancy Hult Ganis, a fellow film and TV producer who developed and executive produced the series.

Ganis has been working extensively in China with the Chinese government on various film projects. He is co-founder and Chairman of Jiaflix Enterprises, a US company with a long-term exclusive arrangement with the China Movie Channel and the website 1905, both under SAPPRFT (SARFT). He was an Honorary Chairman of Wuxi Studios, located near Shanghai. Notably, Jiaflix was an important part of the record-breaking success of Transformers: Age of Extinction in China for Paramount Pictures, surpassing the previous box office record of Avatar. Currently, he is producing the feature film SHADOW SONG with partners at The H Collective Holdings in Los Angeles. Shadow Song is based on the short film A Children's Song, which he produced in 2015.

Non-profit organization positions
Preceded by Frank Pierson	President of the Academy of Motion Picture Arts and Sciences; 2005–2009	Succeeded by Tom Sherak
