= A Way with Words =

American radio program

- Genre: Call-in talk radio about language arts topics
- Running time: 55 min.
- Country of origin: United States
- Language: English
- Syndicates: Public Radio Exchange, Public Radio Satellite System, web
- Hosted by: Martha Barnette and Grant Barrett
- Created by: Wayword, Inc.
- Executive producer: Stefanie Levine
- Recording studio: San Diego
- Original release: 1998 – present
- No. of episodes: 1,621
- Audio format: Stereophonic
- Website: waywordradio.org
- Podcast: A Way with Words podcast

A Way with Words is an American weekly public radio program discussing the use of language (mainly American and Canadian English, with other languages earning more occasional mention) in everyday life, along with linguistics, lexicology and folk etymology from a pool of listener questions from weekly callers into the program, along with a weekly word game with quiz expert and comedian John Chaneski. The program is distributed mainly for weekend airing across member stations of NPR, utilizing the Public Radio Exchange for program distribution. That week's program is then distributed weekly as a podcast on Mondays.

== Background ==
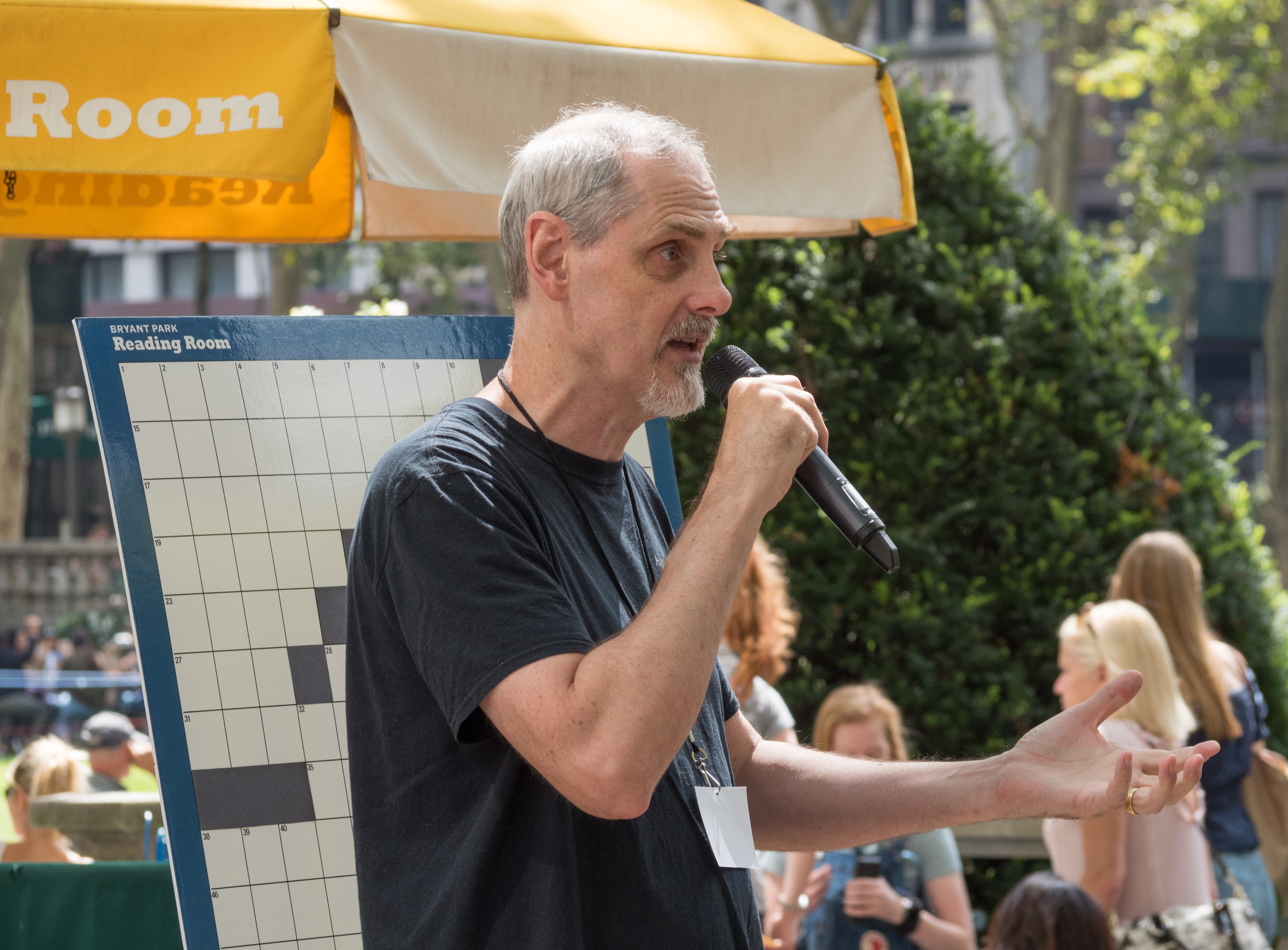
John Chaneski in 2019

It was produced by KPBS-FM in San Diego from 1998 to 2007 and has since then been produced by Wayword, Inc. The show was originally hosted by authors Richard Lederer and Charles Harrington Elster. After five and a half years, Elster left the show and was replaced by journalist and writer Martha Barnette. In October 2006, Lederer announced his retirement from the show. He was replaced by writer and lexicographer Grant Barrett in January 2007. On August 2, 2007, KPBS-FM announced it would stop production of A Way with Words, saying it did not have enough experience or manpower to distribute a weekly program across North America. In September 2007, Martha Barnette and Grant Barrett, co-hosts of A Way with Words, along with the show's producer Stefanie Levine, announced the creation of Wayword, Inc., an independent production company that would continue series production. Wayword began to distribute the program with the November 24/25, 2007 episode. Its distribution has since increased across the nation under this arrangement, from a quarter-million listens each week to half a million.

As of August 16, 2023, the show has produced 1,621 episodes.
