= Throw to the wolves =

English metaphorical idiom

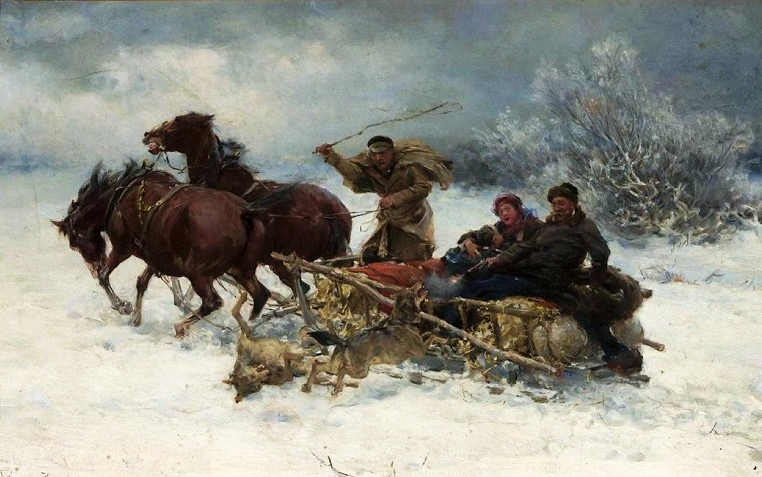
Wolves attacking a sleigh

"Throw to the wolves" is an English metaphorical idiom, meaning to sacrifice someone to save or benefit oneself or one's group. "Throw to the wolves" is also sometimes used more generally to describe abandoning someone for any reason (such as some unwanted trait or property of the victim herself), cognate with "throw to the lions" and "throw to the dogs", which also derive from the supposedly man-eating appetites of a beast. "Kick to the curb" or "throw under the bus" are more modern equivalents of the phrase.

== Origins and use ==
The story and its derivative metaphor are found in America and Europe, from at least the 19th century. A Russian idiom with the same meaning is "lighten the sleigh" (облегчить сани).

The old story occurs to me – the Russian father and mother who threw over their children to stay the wolves...

— Punch, 1877

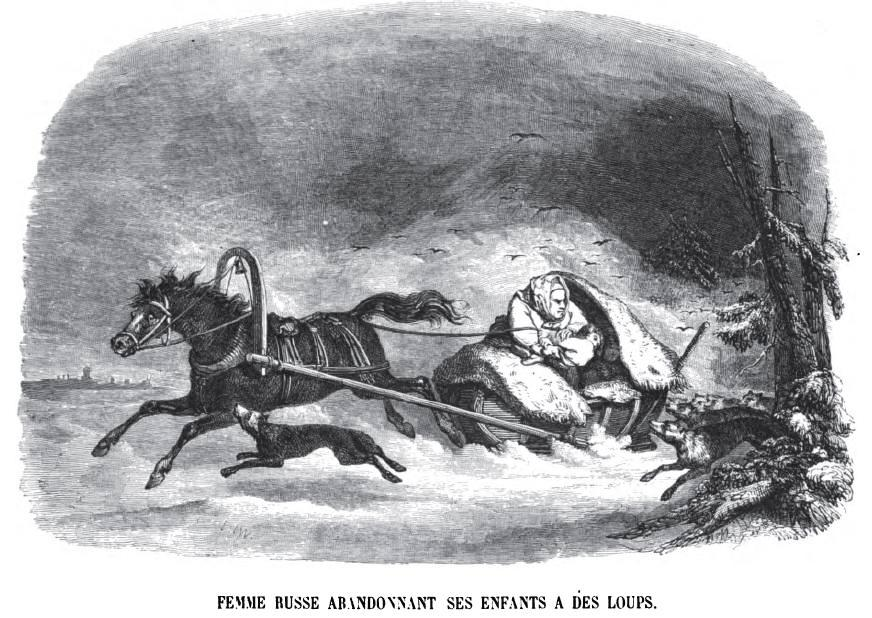
"Russian woman throwing her babies to wolves", as envisioned in a 19th C. French engraving

The idiom was current among American immigrants from Russia – including especially ethnic Germans – to the American Great Plains. In Russia, many folktales concerning wolves are told. One such type of tale concerns a troika or other sleigh, or a convoy of sleighs, beset by wolves. One or more passengers are thrown out, to satisfy the wolves or at any rate slow them while they devour their prey, usually to no avail.

Other tales tell of parents sacrificing their children to save themselves. In one, a couple throws their baby to the harrying wolves; the baby is not noticed by the wolves, who go on to kill and devour the couple. In one tale, a wedding party of three sleighs is attacked by packs of wolves. Two sleighs are destroyed, and the drivers of the third eject the bride and groom, but in vain; everyone is killed.

In a similar tale the drivers sacrificing the wedding party survive, but are shunned by society. The American novelist Willa Cather's 1918 novel My Ántonia contains a variation of this version: the characters Peter and Pavel are revealed to have done exactly this, and to have been driven by shunning to emigrate to Nebraska, where the novel is set. The English writer Robert Browning's 1879 poem "Ivàn Ivànovitch" uses this motif; a mother throws her children to wolves attacking her sleigh, and barely survives. The axeman Ivàn Ivànovitch, upon hearing her tale, immediately and summarily beheads the woman, for which act he is absolved by the village priest. An 1855 book, The Englishwoman in Russia, has a similar tale and ending and may have inspired Browning's poem.

In "The Silent Speaker", a Nero Wolfe novel by Rex Stout, Archie Goodwin comments on a client who is willing to frame a confederate for murder by saying, “It reminds me of that old picture, there was one in our dining room out in Ohio, of the people in the sleigh throwing the baby out to the wolves that were chasing them."

Drs. P's 1974 song, "Dodenrit" ("Death Ride"), his most popular, is an extensive reimagining of the story, and the metaphor remains commonly understood and in current use on both sides of the Atlantic into the 21st century.

== See also ==
- Law of the jungle
- Lifeboat ethics
- Precarity
- Social support
- Social vulnerability
- Trial by ordeal
