= Nancy Hult Ganis =

American film producer

Nancy Hult Ganis (born c. 1948) is an American TV and film publicist, writer, producer and developer as well as the co-founder and partner of Out of the Blue…Entertainment. Ganis' most recent credits include the 2006 film Akeelah and the Bee and the 2011 ABC television series Pan Am.

== Education and early career ==
After growing up in Detroit, Michigan, Hult's professional life started as a math teacher in her hometown's inner-city public schools. In 1968 she left teaching to fly with Pan Am as a flight attendant. During her years traveling the world as a "stewardess", especially in conversation with international journalists, she became aware of the difference between policies the U.S. stated in public and the deeds it carried out in the field. In the early 1970s she observed the flight attendant profession lose respectability, exemplified by her seeing a PSA flight crew uniformed in hot pants, which made her think she would not want to continue much longer. In 1976 she entered the University of California at Berkeley as an undergraduate and in 1978 she received a bachelor's degree in history. She applied to Berkeley's master's degree program in journalism, and was told by her adviser to avoid any mention of being a stewardess; a condition she saw as ironic because the experience had given her a wider world view than the other applicants. She was accepted to the program and she earned her master's degree in 1981. Hult next worked as a journalist and in the public affairs department at San Francisco's PBS station, KQED. In addition to these duties at KQED, Hult also worked as a segment producer and writer covering foreign affairs and public policy issues. Her next big assignment at KQED was working on The Making of Raiders of the Lost Ark; the documentary won an Emmy for the program's producer, and Hult's future husband, Sid Ganis.

Following the success of the Raiders documentary, Hult Ganis worked as a developer for the PBS series Comedy Tonight. What began as a showcase featuring Bay Area comedians such as Dana Carvey later listed national headliners such as Bobcat Goldthwait, Kevin Pollak, and Ellen DeGeneres. Whoopi Goldberg hosted the series in 1987.

After working as Steven Spielberg's assistant, Hult Ganis returned to San Francisco and a position as special projects director for the CBS affiliate, KPIX; during her tenure, the station went from last to first in Arbitron the major market ratings.

== Hollywood, films, politics ==
After her success at KPIX, Hult Ganis started her own production and marketing firm. This venture allowed her to work with Saul Zaentz on the film Amadeus, Francis Ford Coppola on Peggy Sue Got Married and Lucasfilm on Howard the Duck.

Hult Ganis moved permanently to Los Angeles in 1986 and set up the marketing department for Carolco Pictures, at that time an independent film production company. While with Carolco, Hult Ganis handled such films as Extreme Prejudice, Angel Heart, and the Tom Hanks/Sally Field vehicle, Punchline. After her move to Los Angeles, Hult Ganis became more politically active and joined the Hollywood Woman's Political Committee. This connection allowed her to co-produce the "Bells for Hope Celebration" shown at the inauguration of U.S. President Bill Clinton. Having established an association with the Clinton Administration, Hult Ganis was able to contribute once again to her first love, education, by working with the president and his advisors on education issues. In the same vein, Hult Ganis worked with Michael J. Fox on promoting the importance of having educational themes in television programs and movies to her producer and director contacts in Hollywood.

In 1996, Hult Ganis and her husband, Sid Ganis, created Out of the Blue...Entertainment, a film production company with credits that list both Deuce Bigalow: Male Gigolo and Deuce Bigalow: European Gigolo; the Adam Sandler films Mr. Deeds and Big Daddy; and Akeelah and the Bee for Lionsgate Films, among others.

== Pan Am ==
Out of the Blue produced the 2011 ABC series, Pan Am, a period-based show focusing on the iconic airline, Pan American World Airways, and its in-the-air employees during the early 1960s. Initial development for the series came directly from executive producer Hult Ganis' own experience as a stewardess with Pan Am from 1968 to 1976.

Not only relying on her own experiences with the airline, as developer, Hult Ganis researched details for the show by reading up on Pan Am history and interviewing former Pan Am stewardesses. During the interviews, she learned about Pan Am's involvement in U.S. State Department operations and behind-the-scenes missions prior to the beginning of the Six-Day War in the Middle East. Aside from finding plot line and story development ideas, Hult Ganis also spends time monitoring the mannerisms and behaviors of the show's characters in scripts as well as on the set. This includes being watchful of costuming, speaking habits and dialect of the characters, and even the smallest of details such as gum chewing and whether or not Pan Am employees would be seen in public drinking anything in an open can or cup. In September 2011, Hult Ganis told Wired magazine online, "I brought together a lot of former Pan Am people to talk to them about their experiences. No one character is any one person, but there's elements of our stories in the stories [on the show]."

== Personal life and philanthropy ==
Hult Ganis is married to motion picture executive and former president of the Academy of Motion Picture Arts and Sciences, Sid Ganis. Together, Hult Ganis and her husband participate in charity giving through a fund they have set up with The San Francisco Foundation, a network of philanthropists and civic leaders working toward investing in the San Francisco community. Hult Ganis cites growing up in civil rights-era Detroit, as well as her work in inner-city areas there, as being the catalyst for her desire to give to the community she is a part of. During a 2008 interview she stated, "...I saw at a fairly early age that there were terrible inequities in the education system. I lived in a good neighborhood so we had great public schools, but that was not the case in the inner city. I was shocked to see kids in this country who had so little and no access to a quality education. I often wondered what it was like for the other children to study or take entry exams such as an SAT without any sufficient resources available to them. Ever since then, I have always felt compelled to try to give back."
