= Charles Harrington Elster =

American writer (1957–2023)

- Born: July 14, 1957; Queens, New York, U.S.
- Died: March 1, 2023 (aged 65); San Diego, California, U.S.
- Occupation(s): Writer, broadcaster

Charles Harrington Elster (July 14, 1957 – March 1, 2023) was an American writer, broadcaster, and logophile. In 1998, he was one of two original co-hosts of the national weekly public radio show A Way with Words, which he resigned from in 2004 after a dispute with management. He is known for his clear, sonorous voice on programs such as Verbal Advantage.

Elster was the author of numerous books about language, including the adult vocabulary-building programs Word Workout and Verbal Advantage; the high school vocabulary-building novels Tooth and Nail: A Novel Approach to the SAT and Test of Time: A Novel Approach to the SAT and ACT; The Big Book of Beastly Mispronunciations, which the late William Safire of The New York Times called "the most readable, sensible, and prescriptive guide to the words that trip us up"; The Accidents of Style: Good Advice on How Not to Write Badly; There's a Word for It, a lighthearted guide to unusual but unusually useful words; What in the Word? Wordplay, Word Lore, and Answers to Your Peskiest Questions About Language; and How to Tell Fate from Destiny, and Other Skillful Word Distinctions.

Elster was a consultant for Garner's Modern English Usage and he was the pronunciation editor of Black's Law Dictionary. His articles appeared in the Boston Globe, Wall Street Journal, Los Angeles Times, San Diego Union-Tribune, Copyediting, Verbatim, and other publications. He was also a voice talent with more than 25 years' experience recording educational material, industrials, and books—including his own Verbal Advantage, Word Workout, and How to Tell Fate from Destiny.

He died on March 1, 2023, at the age of 65 due to cancer.
