= KPBS Public Media =

Public broadcasting organization in San Diego, California

KPBS Public Media is a not-for-profit organization licensed to San Diego State University (SDSU) with three sections:

- KPBS (TV), a television station (channel 15)
- KPBS-FM, a radio station (89.5)
- KPBS-Digital, a news website

== Journalism hub ==
In 2018, KPBS held discussions with CapRadio, KQED in San Francisco, and KPCC in Pasadena to form a "journalist hub", following a recent initiative of NPR to deepen collaboration between NPR and member stations on journalism, fundraising and digital platforms.

The stations had experience collaborating on special coverage, including the May 10, 2016, California Counts U.S. Senate Debate with California Attorney General Kamala Harris, U.S. Rep. Loretta Sanchez, former California Republican Party heads George "Duf" Sundheim and Tom Del Beccaro, and Republican Ron Unz. The debate aired live on KPBS-TV in San Diego and on public media stations across the state.

As the stations expand their work together, they aim to "have less redundancy in our coverage and more proficiency", according to Joe Barr, chief content officer at CapRadio. The stations want to report on state-wide events collectively instead of duplicating efforts, for example when reporting on state's wildfires.

== See also ==
- Institute for Nonprofit News (member)
