= Double-Tongued Dictionary =

Online dictionary of slang and jargon

The Double-Tongued Dictionary is an online dictionary. It catalogs a growing lexicon of undocumented or under-documented words on the fringes of English, focusing on slang, jargon, and new words.

Formerly known as the Double-Tongued Word Wrester, the dictionary strives to record terms and expressions that are omitted, or are poorly covered, in mainstream dictionaries. It also features definitions and citations of strange and unusual words or phrases such as "parergon," "epigenetics," and "bleeding deacon."

In July 2012 the "Double-Tongued Dictionary" website became part of "A Way with Words" website.

The information on this site is compiled, written and edited by lexicographer Grant Barrett.
