= KPBS (TV) =

Television station in San Diego

- San Diego, California; United States
- Channels: Digital: 19 (UHF); Virtual: 15
- Branding: KPBS

Programming
- Affiliations: 15.1: PBS; for others, see § Subchannels

Ownership
- Owner: San Diego State University; (The Board of Trustees of the California State University for San Diego State University)
- Sister stations: KPBS-FM

History
- First air date: June 12, 1967
- Former call signs: KEBS-TV (1967–1970); KPBS-TV (1970–1991)
- Former channel numbers: Analog: 15 (UHF, 1967–2009); Digital: 30 (UHF, 2001-2019)
- Former affiliations: NET (1967–1970)
- Call sign meaning: Public Broadcasting Service

Technical information
- Licensing authority: FCC
- Facility ID: 6124
- ERP: 285 kW
- HAAT: 572.7 m (1,879 ft)
- Transmitter coordinates: 32°41′52.7″N 116°56′6.3″W

Links
- Public license information: Public file; LMS
- Website: www.kpbs.org

KPBS (channel 15) is a PBS member television station in San Diego, California, United States. Owned by San Diego State University (SDSU) as part of KPBS Public Media, it is a sister station to NPR member KPBS-FM (89.5). The two outlets share studios at the Conrad Prebys Media Complex at Copley Center on Campanile Drive on the SDSU campus. The TV station's transmitter is located on San Miguel Mountain in southwestern San Diego County.

== History ==
In 1960, San Diego State College (now San Diego State University) applied for a license from the Federal Communications Commission (FCC) to operate a non-commercial educational television station to serve San Diego. The station first signed on the air on June 12, 1967, as KEBS-TV. The station was originally a member of National Educational Television (NET) before becoming a member of PBS when it launched in October 1970, at which time the station changed its call letters to KPBS-TV. While the station's call letters mimic the callsign schemes used by stations owned by ABC, NBC, and CBS in New York City and Los Angeles, KPBS is not an owned-and-operated station (nor is similarly named WPBS-TV in Watertown, New York), as PBS cannot own or operate any of its member stations or regional member networks due to the service's local and non-profit nature. The KPBS call sign reflects the station's affiliation and programming, but not any special status within PBS.

KPBS started broadcasting digital television on November 21, 2001. On June 12, 2009, the station turned off its analog signal over UHF channel 15 in accordance with the federal mandate for transitioning television broadcast from analog to digital. The station's digital signal remained on its pre-transition UHF channel 30.

On January 1, 2011, when Los Angeles' longtime PBS station KCET ended its membership, KPBS began to be carried on cable providers in the Bakersfield market, alongside fellow PBS stations KVCR-DT in San Bernardino and KVPT in Fresno. It is also one of three PBS member stations that serve the Palm Springs market, alongside KVCR-DT and KOCE-TV in Huntington Beach (which succeeded KCET as Los Angeles' primary PBS member station).

By the middle of the 2010s, KPBS experienced budgetary constraints and erosion of viewership. The locally produced current affairs show Full Focus attracted less than one percent of the potential audience. One of the ways to increase viewership was to increase the number of subchannels as other public TV stations had done.

On March 26, 2019, the digital signal moved to UHF channel 19 as a result of spectrum reallocation.

== News programming ==
KPBS produces a nightly half-hour news program on weeknights titled KPBS Evening Edition, a self-contained television newscast that is an extension of the Midday Edition newscast aired by its radio sister. KPBS' news department is editorially independent from the station's management, San Diego State University and corporate underwriters and donors. The station's investigative reports are conducted in collaboration with the nonprofit newsgathering organization inewsource, which shares a newsroom with KPBS television and radio at the Campanile Drive studios.

The station collaborates on breaking news coverage and shares news video with San Diego ABC affiliate KGTV (channel 10).

== Subchannels ==
The station's signal is multiplexed:

Subchannels of KPBS
Subchannel	Res.	Short name	Programming
15.1	720p	KPBSHD	PBS
15.2	720p	KPBSH2	World / local programming
15.3	480i	CREATE	Create
15.4	480i	PBSKIDS	PBS Kids

The initial lineup consisted of two multiplexed channels: the main high definition channel in 720p and the standard definition channel in 480i, the latter used for DTV simulcast of analog channel 15. In 2006, an SD sub-channel was added, carrying content from Create. That same year, the main HD channel was switched from 720p to 1080i. Later that year, KPBS dropped the simulcast of analog channel 15 and implemented statistical multiplexing.

In 2007, KPBS replaced Create with V-me, a 24/7 Spanish-language public television channel.

In January 2017, V-me ended its multicast service for public television, transitioning to commercial cable. KPBS, along with many other PBS member stations, replaced V-me with the PBS Kids multicast channel. KPBS relaunched Create subchannel and added one more subchannel, KPBS2. John Decker, director of programming at KPBS in San Diego, explained that multicasts such as PBS Kids, Create, World, and locally developed programming "give public TV an opportunity to increase value and thus loyalty among viewers" as well as "allow KPBS to expand its universe".

Simultaneously with the 2017 lineup change, KPBS switched its HD format from 1080i to 720p and changed aspect ratio of SD channels from 4:3 to 16:9. Image quality degradation, caused by sharing of available bandwidth over four multiplexed channels, was noticed by viewers.
