= KPBS-FM =

Public radio station in San Diego, California, United States

- San Diego, California; United States
- Broadcast area: San Diego County and Imperial County, California; Tijuana and Mexicali, Baja California
- RDS: KPBS.ORG

Programming
- Language: English
- Format: Public radio: Talk
- Subchannels: HD2: Classical music (Classical 24); HD3: Downtempo–Chillout
- Affiliations: NPR; APM; PRX; BBC World Service

Ownership
- Owner: San Diego State University
- Sister stations: KPBS

History
- First air date: September 12, 1960
- Former call signs: KEBS-FM (1960–1970)
- Call sign meaning: Taken from KPBS

Links
- Webcast: Listen live
- Website: kpbs.org
- For technical information on KPBS-FM and its repeaters, see § Technical information.

KPBS-FM (89.5 FM) is a non-commercial radio station licensed to San Diego, California, United States, carrying a public radio format as an NPR member station. It is owned by San Diego State University (SDSU) alongside PBS member KPBS (channel 15) as part of KPBS Public Media. The two outlets share studios at The Conrad Prebys Media Complex in Copley Center (formerly the Copley Telecommunications Center) on Campanile Drive, part of the SDSU campus.

The station's transmitter is on Mount Soledad in La Jolla. KPBS-FM is additionally simulcast on translator K206AC (89.1 FM) in La Jolla, on full-power satellite KQVO (97.7 FM) in Calexico, California, and Mexicali, Baja California, and on satellite KRAM (90.5 FM) in Borrego Springs.

== History ==
=== Early years ===
The station signed on the air on September 12, 1960. The original call sign was KEBS-FM. It was owned by what was then San Diego State College. KEBS-FM was a college radio station, used for students to train for careers in broadcasting. In its first decade, the station was powered at 2,000 watts, a fraction of its current output.

It changed its call letters to KPBS-FM in 1970. When National Public Radio (NPR) was launched in 1971, KPBS-FM became one of the network's three charter members in California, along with KCRW in Los Angeles and KQED-FM in San Francisco. KPBS-FM was one of the 90 stations that aired the initial broadcast of All Things Considered when it premiered on May 3, 1971.

=== Adding KQVO ===
In 2005, San Diego State University bought a commercial FM radio station in an underserved part of Southern California. It paid $1.1 million for 97.7 KQVO, a Class A station in Calexico. KQVO first signed on the air in March 1984. Over the years, it aired a variety of formats.

KPBS-FM wanted to give Imperial County its first public radio station. KQVO began simulcasting KPBS-FM, airing news, talk and NPR programming. The station switched to non-commercial status.

=== From classical to news/talk ===
KPBS-FM primarily played classical music until mid-1990s, when it started adding more NPR programs and news to its format. The wake-up broadcast Morning Edition was put on the schedule along with midday talk shows including Fresh Air. Beginning May 23, 2011, the station discontinued its classical music programming in the evening hours and moved all music to an online stream. When it began broadcasting using HD Radio technology, KPBS-FM added a full time classical music subchannel.

In 2009, the radio, TV and digital news operations were merged into a single content-producing division. This allowed KPBS to produce television and radio news simultaneously.

=== San Diego wildfires ===
The California wildfires of October 2007 in the San Diego area affected KPBS broadcasts. Power was lost to the tower shared by KPBS-FM and KPBS television on Mount San Miguel.

Within three hours, alternative rock station KBZT agreed to air KPBS' wildfire coverage until the station could return to a backup operation from its studios on the San Diego State University campus, which occurred the next day. KPBS later restored full coverage from Mount San Miguel using a backup generator.

On October 1, 2012, KPBS boosted its effective radiated power from 2,700 watts to 26,000 watts. It also moved its tower from Mount San Miguel to Mount Soledad.

=== Adding KRAM ===
In 2025, Gabriel Wisdom of America Money Management bought a radio station in Borrego Springs, where radio coverage was inadequate despite being part of San Diego County due to the local topography. On February 10, 2026, the station began simulcasting KPBS-FM, providing radio news, talk, and NPR programming to the desert region. The station also provides emergency information in the event of cell or landline outage during natural disaster.

== Programming ==
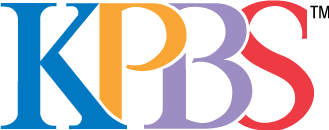
Former logo

KPBS-FM, KQVO, and KRAM have a public radio format with an emphasis on talk, with programming sourced from NPR, American Public Media, the Public Radio Exchange and the BBC World Service. KPBS-FM also produces a daily one-hour San Diego-focused interview and call-in show, Midday Edition, hosted by Jade Hindmon.

=== HD subchannels and streaming ===
KPBS has three HD Radio channels. KPBS-HD1 is a digital simulcast of the main analog channel that airs NPR news and talk shows. KPBS-HD2 airs "Classical San Diego", featuring music from the syndicated Classical 24 service. KPBS-HD3 offers SomaFM's syndicated "Groove Salad" format.

The KPBS Radio Reading Service broadcasts the readings of newspapers, books, and magazines to those with low vision, blindness, and other impairments. The Reading Service is available 24 hours a day over a private audio channel, and online via audio webstream.

== Technical information ==
KPBS-FM and retransmitters
Call sign	Frequency	City of license	FID	ERP (W)	HAAT	Class	First air date	Transmitter coordinates	FCC info
KPBS-FM	89.5 FM	San Diego	58823	26,000	208 m (682 ft)	B	September 12, 1960	32°50′17″N 117°14′57″W	Public file LMS
KQVO	97.7 FM	Calexico	8175	6,000	93 m (305 ft)	B	March 1984	32°40′48″N 115°25′36″W	Public file LMS
KRAM	90.5 FM	Borrego Springs	762494	470	−347 m (−1,138 ft)	B	February 10, 2026	33°15′25″N 116°22′27″W	Public file LMS
