= Fox Trial Finder =

Website for clinical trials

The Fox Trial Finder is a website which facilitates Parkinson's disease clinical research by matching research participants in the United States to clinical trials. The Michael J. Fox Foundation hosts the service.

One of the motivations for establishing the platform was a lack of other suitable options for patients to seek and find clinical trials to join. ClinicalTrials.gov is somewhat of an option as it does provide information on all clinical trials. In practice, the Michael J. Fox Foundation felt that its research participants needed a similar service but more customized for their needs. The platform was established in 2012 at a time when such a service was new and other research organizations were establishing similar services. A 2014 paper described the Fox Trial Finder as being part of a broader trend for researchers to support patient communities in organizing themselves to participate in trials.

The Michael J. Fox foundation does a range of other social experiments and interventions which interrelate to the platform and have the overall intent to make for better engagement between clinical trials and research participants. The platform has experimented with conducting research participant study visits through remote video chat. In coordination with the platform, the platform has connected research participants with transportation to study sites.

A 2015 evaluation found that the Fox Trial Finder was able to operate as intended and actually match research participants to trials.
