= Trust Me, I'm Dr. Ozzy =

2011 book by Ozzy Osbourne

Trust Me, I'm Dr. Ozzy: Advice from Rock's Ultimate Survivor
- First edition (UK)
- Author: Ozzy Osbourne with Chris Ayres
- Language: English
- Subject: Autobiography
- Genre: Non-fiction, comedy
- Publisher: Grand Central Publishing (US); Sphere Books (UK)
- Publication date: 11 October 2011
- Publication place: United Kingdom
- Media type: Print (Hardcover)
- Pages: 304 pp
- Preceded by: I Am Ozzy
- Followed by: Last Rites

Trust Me, I'm Dr. Ozzy: Advice from Rock's Ultimate Survivor (shortened to Trust Me, I'm Dr. Ozzy) is a book by Ozzy Osbourne, singer of Black Sabbath and solo artist. It is the sequel to his 2010 release I Am Ozzy. The book chronicles his drug abuse and survival stories about 40 years of Ozzy's drug and alcohol abuse. It also features Osbourne's health advice, taken from the "Trust Me, I'm Dr. Ozzy" column originally published on The Sunday Times. The column and book were co-written by Chris Ayres, because of Osbourne's dyslexia.
