= Research in Parkinson's disease =

Research related to Parkinson's disease

The research in Parkinson's disease (also known as clinical trials, medical research, research studies, or clinical studies) refers to any study intended to help answer questions about etiology, diagnostic approaches or new treatments for Parkinson's disease (PD). Research can take many forms, including reviewing records of PD patients, observing the course of the disease in a cohort of patients and clinical trials. Clinical trials are designed and conducted by scientists and medical experts who recruit individuals so as to test new forms of diagnosis or treatment.

Only a small fraction of patients with Parkinson's disease participate in clinical research and specially in clinical trials. When clinical trials lack participation, it causes a significant delay in the development of new drugs and treatments.

== Research directions ==
One of the purposes of clinical research is to test the safety and efficacy of new treatments. Clinical research may also be conducted to learn other things about medical treatments or procedures, such as how to make an earlier diagnosis or how the treatment interacts with other drugs.

Though there are many types of clinical research, the two most common are interventional and observational. For example, researchers trying to identify causes of PD may conduct an observational study to examine genetic or environmental factors that may have triggered the disease in an individual. Natural history studies that evaluate how Parkinson's affects different people and how it changes over time are another example of observational research. Diagnostic accuracy studies are used to investigate how well a test, or a series of tests, are able to correctly identify diseased patients.

Researchers conducting clinical trials test the impact of treatments. These can include changing behavior, taking medications, or performing surgery. Interventional and observational research are equally important in helping to answer questions, develop new treatments, and ultimately find a cure for Parkinson's. Clinical trials are conducted in a series of phases.

Among the interventional and observational studies for Parkinson's disease, research is ongoing in a number of specific areas.

=== Quality of life ===
Quality of life research investigates the function that physical therapy, occupational therapy, exercise or other interventions may play in the quality of life of persons with Parkinson's disease. Persons with Parkinson's disease may experience motor symptoms (tremors, rigidity, slowness of movement, postural instability and gait dysfunctions) as well as non-motor symptoms (neuropsychiatric symptoms, autonomic dysfunction, or other; see Parkinson's disease). Due to this diversity of symptoms, Parkinson's disease may impact upon an individual's physical, social and mental well-being. For example, difficulties with movement can lead to difficulties with self-care, embarrassment, social-isolation, and depression.

Research may investigate whether there is a relationship between quality of life and a symptom of Parkinson's disease. Research on Parkinson's disease has investigated the link between quality of life and axial rigidity, personality traits, and patient education.

Alternatively, a study may evaluate the effectiveness of an intervention on the mitigation of symptoms, and the subsequent impact on quality of life. For example, an ongoing clinical study exploring vitamin D as a possible therapy to improve balance and decrease the risk of falling in people with Parkinson's expects a subsequent increase in safety and well-being. Another recent study used data mining and analysis from previous clinical research to explore improvement in motor function people with Parkinson's disease experience after treatment with levodopa. The study concluded that motor learning in the presence of levodopa may improve the body's ability to adapt to Parkinson's disease.

Quality of life measures are increasingly being incorporated into clinical trials, therefore much research has gone into validating quality of life measures for persons with Parkinson's disease.

=== Neuroprotection ===
Neuroprotection is treatment that may slow down, stop, or reverse the progression of Parkinson's. Researchers are attempting to develop neuroprotective agents for Parkinson's disease, as well as other neurodegenerative brain disorders.

Several molecules have been proposed as potential neuroprotective treatments. However, none of them has been conclusively demonstrated to reduce degeneration in clinical trials. Agents currently under investigation as neuroprotective agents include anti-apoptotic drugs (omigapil, CEP-1347), antiglutamatergic agents, monoamine oxidase inhibitors (selegiline, rasagiline), promitochondrial drugs (coenzyme Q10, creatine), calcium channel blockers (isradipine) and growth factors (GDNF).

Researchers are also investigating vaccines for Parkinson's disease that produce cells that change the way the body's immune system responds to the loss of dopamine. This treatment has shown success in reversing Parkinson's in mice, and researchers are investigating the viability of clinical studies in people.

Exercise may be neuroprotective. Animal studies show exercise may protect against dopaminergic neurotoxins, and research conducted via prospective studies shows the risk of Parkinson's disease in humans is reduced significantly by midlife exercise. More research is needed to investigate the benefits of exercise in the early stage of Parkinson's, the most suitable type of exercise, when exercise should be implemented, and the optimal duration of exercises.

A 2009 review of 11 systematic reviews and 230 random controlled trials, showed the effectiveness of Chinese herbal medicine (CHM) as a paratherapy for Parkinson's disease patients.

=== Genetics ===
Of those people with PD, it is only a small percentage that inherits the disease. However, the study of genetic forms of Parkinson's can assist scientists in learning more about the non-inherited forms. Several current studies are examining the genetic factors of Parkinson's disease. An example of genetic research is a recent study that investigated the GBA gene as a suspected cause of early-onset Parkinson's.

A genetic study involving researchers from BGI Genomics reveals the genetic cause of Parkinson's disease. The study, published in Neuroscience Bulletin, discovered that a mutation in the Cysteinyl-tRNA synthetase (CARS) gene (c.2384A>T; p.Glu795Val; E795V) is responsible, offering a new path for prevention and control of the disease.

=== Surgery ===
Advances in surgical procedures and neuroimaging techniques have ensured that surgical approaches can be as effective as medication at relieving some PD symptoms. Deep brain stimulation (DBS) is a surgical technique whereby a tiny electrode is inserted deep in the brain. The electrode is connected to a battery pack implanted under the collarbone via a subcutaneous wire. DBS is effective in suppressing symptoms of PD, especially tremor. A recent clinical study led to recommendations on identifying which Parkinson's patients are most likely to benefit from DBS.

== Astrocytes ==
In an animal model, manipulating glial precursor cells produced astrocytes that repaired Parkinson's multiple types of neurological damage. The researchers implanted cells only in rats with disease signs. The astrocytes used in the study differ from other types of astrocytes present in the mature brain. When implanted into the brains of rats with the disease, the new cells acted similar to astrocytes in the developing brain, which are more effective at building connections between nerves. The implanted astrocytes restored health and stability and allowed the nerve cells to resume normal activity.

Successful long-term therapy must both protect the areas of the brain under attack and foster the repair of dopaminergic neurons damage to other brain cell populations. Astrocyte dysfunction can contribute to multiple neurological disorders.

After transplantation, dopaminergic, interneurons and synaptophysin were all rescued. Interneurons play an important role in information processing and movement control and are lost in Parkinson's. Synaptophysin is a protein that is essential for communication between nerve cells. The transplanted rats recovered motor skills to normal levels, essentially reversing all symptoms. No previous therapies rescued these cells.

== Participant groups ==
Parkinson's clinical research studies need volunteers at all stages of the disease to help solve the unanswered questions about Parkinson's and to develop new treatments. Some studies seek to enroll specific groups of people.

=== Newly diagnosed ===
A number of Parkinson's disease clinical research studies seek to enroll people newly diagnosed with PD that are not currently undergoing any treatment. These trials vary in scope, some focusing on neuroprotection in which researchers seek to determine whether a certain compound might offer protection to dopamine-producing cells, thus helping to slow or stop the progression of the disease.

=== Healthy controls ===
In addition to patients with PD, healthy controls, including friends and family members of those with Parkinson's, are also needed for clinical trials. Family members may participate in genetic studies, and healthy people can participate in trials that require a control group of participants without PD. Control groups are necessary as a means of testing the research being studied.

== Participating ==
=== Benefits ===
People with PD, their friends, and their family members all have many reasons to consider participating in clinical research. Many participants believe that their involvement benefits themselves and the future of other people with the disease. Without clinical research participants, many of the advances in treating PD would not have happened. In addition to furthering the scientific community's knowledge of Parkinson's, clinical trial participation may offer access to leading healthcare professionals and potentially useful new drugs and therapies. This care is often provided free of charge in exchange for participation in the study. Finally, by participating in clinical studies, those whose lives are impacted by PD may increase knowledge and understanding of the disease.

== Clinical research resources ==
People with Parkinson's disease who are considering participating in clinical research have resources available to help them navigate the clinical research process. People with PD may consult their doctors, discuss with their family members, and speak to other clinical trials participants about their experiences.

=== Fox Trial Finder ===
Led by The Michael J. Fox Foundation for Parkinson's Research, the Fox Trial Finder is a matching site that connects clinical trials to potential volunteers. Since its launch in 2012, the Fox Trial Finder has registered more than 19,000 volunteers across multiple continents. Volunteers enter their information—from location to the medicines they take—into a profile on Fox Trial Finder, which then matches them to nearby trials seeking volunteers with their particular criteria. The Fox Trial Finder seeks volunteers both with and without Parkinson's disease.

=== Parkinson's Advocates in Research ===
The Parkinson's Disease Foundation's Parkinson's Advocates in Research (PAIR) program is a patient-based initiative that ensures people with Parkinson's disease have a role in shaping the clinical research process. By training advocates with Parkinson's disease to serve as patient representatives on clinical research advisory boards, the PAIR program aims to improve outcomes by helping researchers overcome and identify barriers in research that they may otherwise overlook. The PAIR program trains patients to influence research and treatments.

=== Parkinson's Disease Biomarkers Program ===
The NINDS Parkinson's Disease Biomarkers Program brings together various stakeholders to create a resource of longitudinal biofluid samples from PD patients and controls and their associated clinical assessment data for biomarker discovery research. Neuroimaging and genomic data are also available for some of the samples. All samples are stored at the NINDS Human Genetics Repository at Coriell Institute and can be requested through the PDBP Data Management Resource.

== Research organizations ==
The National Institute of Neurological Disorders and Stroke (NINDS), part of the National Institutes of Health (NIH), is a major funder of Parkinson's disease research in the US. In 2012, the NINDS funded approximately $98 million out of a total of $154 million in NIH-supported PD research. The NINDS supports basic, translational, and clinical PD research programs through a variety of mechanisms, including the Morris K. Udall Centers of Excellence for Parkinson's Disease Research and the Parkinson's Disease Biomarkers Program (PDBP). NINDS has just completed a major planning effort to determine priorities for future Parkinson's disease research.

The Parkinson’s Foundation was formed in 2017 following the merger of the Parkinson’s Disease Foundation and the National Parkinson Foundation. It supports research, improves clinical care and provides education and resources for people living with Parkinson’s disease.

The Michael J. Fox Foundation aims to develop a cure for Parkinson's disease. As the largest private foundation for Parkinson's disease in the US, the Michael J. Fox Foundation has spent 325 million dollars on research. In 2010, the Fox foundation launched the first large-scale clinical study on evolution biomarkers of the disease with a cost of 40 million dollars in 5 years.

The CRC for Mental Health is an Australian Federal Government funded research consortium researching biomarkers, imaging reagents and therapeutics for early diagnosis of Parkinson's Disease.

Cure Parkinson's (originally called The Cure Parkinson's Trust when set up in the UK in 2005 by Tom Isaacs) was instrumental in arranging a ground-breaking clinical trial of the drug GDNF at the University of Bristol during the 2010s, and also runs the International Linked Clinical Trials programme in conjunction with the Van Andel Institute.

== See also ==
- List of investigational Parkinson's disease drugs
