= Tom Isaacs (fundraiser) =

British charity fundraiser

Tom Isaacs (2 April 1968 – 31 May 2017) was a British charity fundraiser and the President of The Cure Parkinson's Trust, which he co-founded. Among other achievements, he completed a 4,500-mile charity walk around the coast of Britain in order to raise funds for research into Parkinson's disease

Isaacs, the son of a solicitor, trained as a surveyor, but was diagnosed with Parkinson's Disease in his mid-twenties, while working in London. He went on to found The Cure Parkinson's Trust, with others he had met in the course of his sponsored walk, and raised around £350,000 in total for medical research. He was named Charity Personality of the Year in 2004 and was one of the bearers of the Olympic torch in 2012. He was invited to meet Pope Francis after speaking at the Euro Stem Cell consortium in Rome.

Isaacs was one of the participants in a revolutionary trial of the drug GDNF which took place between 2012 and 2017, in which 41 Parkinson's sufferers had surgery to introduce implants that enabled the drug to be delivered direct to their brain cells, in the hope that the cells contributing to Parkinson's could be repaired.

Isaacs died suddenly, of heart failure, shortly after the trial was completed. Tributes to him included one from The Michael J. Fox Foundation; Fox himself said "Tom's passion, determination and hard work on behalf of everyone living with Parkinson's were the hallmark of his life and will be his continuing legacy in our community." Following his death, the Tom Isaacs Memorial Award was established to honour a researcher into Parkinson's Disease. The first winner was Professor Tom Foltynie of University College, London.

In 2019, the BBC screened a two-part documentary about the GDNF trial, in which Isaacs played a leading role. One reviewer referred to Isaacs' "warmth and charm" as a factor which made the documentary "overwhelmingly and heartbreakingly intimate". The programme later won a Grierson television award for "Best Science Documentary". The judges commented that it "stood out for its lean storytelling of a complex subject, its scale and its heart."
