= I Am Ozzy =

Autobiographical book by Ozzy Osbourne

- Authors: Ozzy Osbourne; Chris Ayres
- Language: English
- Subject: Autobiography
- Genre: Non-fiction
- Publisher: Grand Central Publishing
- Publication date: 25 January 2010
- Publication place: United States
- Media type: Print (Hardcover, paperback)
- Pages: 416 pp
- ISBN: 978-0-446-57313-9
- Followed by: Trust Me, I'm Dr. Ozzy

I Am Ozzy is the autobiography of Ozzy Osbourne, singer of Black Sabbath and solo artist. It chronicles his life, beginning as a child, followed by his career as a vocalist. The book was widely praised by its readers for its level of detail and humour.

The book was co-written by Chris Ayres, due to Osbourne's dyslexia. The audiobook was read by Frank Skinner.

== Reception ==
In 2010, Osbourne won the "Literary Achievement" honour for his memoir, I Am Ozzy, at the Guys Choice Awards at Sony Pictures Studio in Culver City, California. Osbourne was presented with the award by Sir Ben Kingsley. The book debuted at No. 2 on the New York Times' hardcover non-fiction best-seller list.
