= Chris Ayres =

American writer

Chris Ayres is an English born screenwriter, a contributing editor at British GQ, and author. He wrote the book War Reporting for Cowards, and co-wrote Ozzy Osbourne's memoir I Am Ozzy, which became a New York Times Best-Seller.

As a screenwriter, he has sold scripts to Apple TV+, CBS network and Ingenious Media, the latter in partnership with XIX Entertainment and Endeavor Content.

Ayres's recent work for British GQ has included a long-form article about Donald Trump's friendship with Mike Tyson in the late 1980s, and an in-depth profile of Instagram star Dan Bilzerian.

== War Reporting for Cowards ==
First published in 2005, War Reporting for Cowards is an account of being embedded with a forward reconnaissance unit of the U.S. Marines in the run-up to - and during - the 2003 invasion of Iraq.

Ayres was in his late 20s and working for The Times of London, covering entertainment, at the time.

Writing in The New York Times, Michiko Kakutani described the book as "hilarious," adding that it "reads as though Larry David had rewritten 'MASH' and Evelyn Waugh's 'Scoop' as a comic television episode, even as it provides the reader with a visceral picture of the horrors of combat and the peculiar experience of being an embedded reporter." War Reporting for Cowards is today taught in journalism schools.

Academic analysis has described the memoir as a parody of the traditional war correspondent memoir that deconstructs the heroic myth of the war of the correspondent through irony and satire.

== Career ==
Ayres was Los Angeles bureau chief of The Times of London from 2002 until 2010, later becoming a contributing editor at The Sunday Times Magazine (London) and British GQ. He wrote a column with Ozzy Osbourne for Rolling Stone for several years.

Ayres was nominated as Foreign Correspondent of the Year in 2004 and Feature Writer of the Year in 2015 at the British Press Awards.

He was nominated as Writer of the Year in 2016 at the Professional Publishers Association (PPA) Awards.

I Am Ozzy won the Literary Achievement award (2010) at the Guys Choice Awards.

== Education ==
Ayres was educated at The University of Hull, where the Chris Ayres Prize in Politics, Philosophy and Economics is named after him, later completing a postgraduate diploma in newspaper journalism at City University, London.

== Personal life ==
Ayres was born in Newcastle upon Tyne, England, in 1975.

He now lives in Los Angeles with his wife, Lucie, an interior designer, and their two children.
