= The Cure Parkinson's Trust =

Parkinson's disease charity

- Nickname: Cure Parkinson's
- Founded: August 18, 2005; 19 years ago
- Founder: Tom Isaacs
- Purpose: Funding collaborations to discover new treatments and a cure for Parkinson's disease
- Headquarters: London, England
- Fields: Parkinson's disease clinical research
- CEO: Helen Matthews
- Website: cureparkinsons.org.uk

The Cure Parkinson's Trust is a UK charitable organization founded in 2005 by Tom Isaacs to find a cure for Parkinson's disease.

== History ==
Tom Isaacs, a sufferer of Parkinson's disease, founded the organization in 2005 from his home in Croxley Green. He had been diagnosed in 1995 at the age of 26, and was determined to find a cure.

At the time of Isaacs' death in 2017, the organization had raised £7.4 million for Parkinson's research. As of 2024, £25 million has been raised and an additional £100 million secured through partnerships.

The organization specializes in funding development of new therapeutic drugs, and clinical trials to test them.

A large donation stemming from proceeds of 2025's Back to the Beginning concert will be used by the organization to expand clinical trials to even more individuals suffering from the disease.
