= The Michael J. Fox Foundation =

US-based Parkinson's disease charity

The Michael J. Fox Foundation for Parkinson's Research
- Abbreviation: MJFF
- Founded: October 31, 2000; 25 years ago
- Founder: Michael J. Fox
- Tax ID no.: 13-4141945
- Legal status: 501(c)(3) Non-profit
- Headquarters: New York City
- Fields: Parkinson's disease clinical research
- Chairman: Andrew J. O'Brien
- Chief Executive Officer, Co-Founder: Deborah W. Brooks
- Affiliations: MJFF Canada
- Website: michaeljfox.org

The Michael J. Fox Foundation for Parkinson's Research is a US nonprofit organization founded in 2000 by Canadian-American actor Michael J. Fox and Deborah W. Brooks to find treatments and a cure for Parkinson's disease.

== Business model ==
The organization funds grants directly to scientists it assesses as having the best chance of finding a cure. It maintains closer control over and supervision of projects than is typical from other medical-research foundations.

== Fundraising ==
In 2006, it was the "largest private funder of research" into Parkinson's, according to The Guardian. As of 2023, it had raised $2 billion for Parkinson's research projects. According to Town and Country, in 2022 the organization funded more Parkinson's research than the US government. According to Fox Business, it is the largest nonprofit funder of Parkinson's research in the world.

== Work ==
In 2023, a longitudinal study funded by the Parkinson's Progression Markers Initiative, released results in Lancet Neurology showing Parkinson's can be detected by the presence of a biomarker protein, abnormal alpha-synuclein. The biomarker can be detected before the onset of symptoms.

The organization hosts the Fox Trial Finder, a website for presenting clinical trials in Parkinson's disease research.
