= Degradation Trip Volumes 1 & 2 =

Studio album by Jerry Cantrell
- Released: December 10, 2002
- Recorded: July 1999 - March 2000
- Studios: A&M (Hollywood); Master Control (Burbank); Music Grinder (West Hollywood)
- Genres: Alternative metal; grunge; heavy metal; doom metal
- Length: 139:59
- Label: Roadrunner
- Producers: Jerry Cantrell & Jeff Tomei

Jerry Cantrell chronology
Degradation Trip (2002)	Degradation Trip Volumes 1 & 2 (2002)	Brighten (2021)

Degradation Trip Volumes 1 & 2 is a double album by Jerry Cantrell, released on December 10, 2002, through Roadrunner Records. It is an expanded limited edition of Cantrell's Degradation Trip album, which was released five months earlier. All the songs were written long prior to the first release of Degradation Trip. The title was taken from the song "Solitude", the fifth track from the album. Roadrunner Records, uneasy toward the idea of a double album release, made Cantrell condense it, but promised to eventually release all of his material. The album was originally scheduled for a November 26, 2002 release but was later delayed to December 10, 2002.

The track order of the expanded version, which differs from the first, is also presented in Cantrell's originally planned order. Faith No More drummer Mike Bordin and then-Ozzy Osbourne/Black Label Society bassist Robert Trujillo contributed to Degradation Trip, and would tour with Cantrell in support of it in 2001, before the album was released.

The album was released on vinyl for the first time through Music on Vinyl on February 8, 2019, with a limited edition of 2,000 individually numbered copies on quadruple color vinyl.

A 20th anniversary reissue of the album, featuring reimagined artwork and packaging, was released on CD and vinyl on June 23, 2023.

== Recording and background ==
The liner notes for Degradation Trip Volumes 1 & 2 include an article by Don Kaye titled "A Long, Strange Trip". This describes the album's style and features quotes from Cantrell regarding its development and final release as a double album. Cantrell described the initial plans for the album:

"We probably had thirty-plus ideas - it could have been a triple record, you know what I mean? When I was making the record, my co-producer actually gave me George Harrison's triple record (All Things Must Pass), which is one of the coolest things anyone's ever given me. So yeah, this was intended to come out as Degradation Trip Volumes 1 & 2."

Label executives commended Cantrell's ambition but were uneasy about the idea of a double album. As Cantrell had already spent a year searching for a label that would take his album, he compromised and condensed his work on the promise that later on it would be released in its entirety.

For about four months in 1998, Cantrell locked himself in his home to write the 25 songs. He noted that much of the writing was inspired by the demise of Alice in Chains, describing it as "a situation where I had to move on, and not really being happy about it... So it was just coming to grips with all that stuff – and I'm still doing it, especially now that Layne's gone." Consequently, Degradation Trip boasts dark themes and bleak visuals. "It's the hardest record, in some ways, that I've done," Cantrell declared. "It's definitely the most lyrically brutal one. Sonically, it's right up there with Dirt as far as viciousness goes."

Songs like "Pig Charmer" and "Bargain Basement Howard Hughes" are often interpreted as being about the relationship between Cantrell and Staley. "Pig Charmer" has the lines "It turns out he's a big pussy, Satan hoof had its way". "Satan hoof" was the nickname that Staley gave to Cantrell – as mentioned during his interview with Rockline in 1998, while Staley was on the phone. "Owned" and "Pro False Idol" question the career of Cantrell and his status as a musician, while "Feel the Void" and "31/32" explore the concept of lives wasted. Cantrell elaborated, "Throughout the process of making this record, I often wondered at times whether I was insane or not. Sitting here, thinking back on it now, I probably had my moments." He also noted, however, the satisfaction in having released the album as he wanted and being able to put all of the intimate expression to bed.

== Track listing ==
All tracks are written by Jerry Cantrell.

Volume 1
No.	Title	Length
1.	"Psychotic Break"	4:09
2.	"Bargain Basement Howard Hughes"	5:39
3.	"Owned"	5:18
4.	"Angel Eyes"	4:44
5.	"Solitude"	4:01
6.	"Mother's Spinning in Her Grave (Glass Dick Jones)"	3:54
7.	"Hellbound"	6:46
8.	"Spiderbite"	6:38
9.	"Pro False Idol"	7:18
10.	"Feel the Void"	6:57
11.	"Locked On"	5:37
12.	"Gone"	5:08
Total length:		66:04

Volume 2
No.	Title	Length
1.	"Castaway"	4:59
2.	"Chemical Tribe"	6:35
3.	"What It Takes"	4:44
4.	"Dying Inside"	6:26
5.	"Siddhartha"	6:02
6.	"Hurts Don't It?" (instrumental)	4:46
7.	"She Was My Girl"	3:59
8.	"Pig Charmer"	8:11
9.	"Anger Rising"	6:14
10.	"S.O.S."	5:07
11.	"Give It a Name"	4:02
12.	"Thanks Anyway"	5:26
13.	"31/32"	7:25
Total length:		Volume 2: 73:55; Total: 139:59

== Personnel ==
- Jerry Cantrell – guitar, vocals
- Robert Trujillo – bass guitar
- Mike Bordin – drums
- Additional percussion by Walter Earl
- Additional guitar on "Anger Rising" by Chris DeGarmo

Production

- Produced by Jerry Cantrell and Jeff Tomei
- Mixed by Jeff Tomei
- Recorded by Jeff Tomei and Tim Harkins, assisted by Jaime Sikora
- Mastered by George Marino
- Artwork and photography by Team Switzerland
- Liner notes by Don Kaye
- Drum tech – Walter Earl
- Guitar tech – Brett Allen
