= Anger Rising =

2002 single by Jerry Cantrell

Single by Jerry Cantrell

from the album Degradation Trip
- Released: April 2002
- Recorded: 2000
- Studio: A&M Studios in Hollywood, CA; Master Control in Burbank, CA; Music Grinder Studios in West Hollywood, CA
- Genre: Grunge, alternative metal
- Length: 6:14
- Label: Roadrunner
- Songwriter: Jerry Cantrell
- Producers: Jerry Cantrell, Jeff Tomei

Jerry Cantrell singles chronology
"Dickeye" (1998)	"Anger Rising" (2002)	"Angel Eyes" (2002)

"Anger Rising" is a song by American rock musician Jerry Cantrell. It was the lead single from his 2002 solo album, Degradation Trip. Cantrell's fourth single overall, the track made its radio debut in early April 2002. The single spent 18 weeks on Billboard's Mainstream Rock Tracks chart and peaked at No. 10.

"Anger Rising" begins with a choir-like, non-lexical vocal harmony over acoustic guitar. This leads into heavy guitars with a steady beat and an aggressive, snarling chorus. Described by MTV's Joe D'Angelo as "a dysfunctional family portrait with a violent hue that revisits themes found in the Alice in Chains hit "Rooster", the song deals with domestic abuse and evokes imagery of life in a decrepit trailer park.

Chris DeGarmo, formerly of Queensrÿche, makes a guest appearance playing slide guitar on "Anger Rising". DeGarmo had previously performed on tour with Cantrell in promotion of his 1998 album, Boggy Depot. He also recorded music with Mike Inez and Sean Kinney, bandmates of Cantrell, in Spys4Darwin.

== Release ==
"Anger Rising" made its radio debut in early April 2002, spent 18 weeks on Billboard's Mainstream Rock Tracks chart and peaked at No. 10 on June 29, 2002.

The single was made available for free download via Roadrunner Records' official website on May 6, 2002.

== Music video ==
A music video directed by Paul R. Brown was made to accompany the single. It found considerable circulation on MTV2 and Much Music, and can be viewed on Degradation Trip Volumes 1 & 2.

== Chart positions ==
Chart (2002)	Peak position
US Mainstream Rock (Billboard)	10

== Track listing ==
No.	Title	Length
1.	"Anger Rising (Radio Edit)"	5:21
2.	"Anger Rising (Album Version)"	6:14
3.	"Anger Rising (Alternate Radio Edit)"	4:43

== Personnel ==
- Jerry Cantrell – vocals, lead guitar
- Chris DeGarmo – slide guitar
- Robert Trujillo – bass guitar
- Mike Bordin – drums
