= Degradation Trip =

Studio album by Jerry Cantrell
- Released: June 18, 2002
- Recorded: July 1999 - March 2000
- Studios: A&M (Hollywood); Master Control (Burbank); Music Grinder (West Hollywood)
- Genres: Alternative metal; grunge; heavy metal; doom metal
- Length: 72:30
- Label: Roadrunner
- Producers: Jerry Cantrell; Jeff Tomei

Jerry Cantrell chronology
| Boggy Depot (1998) | Degradation Trip (2002) | Degradation Trip Volumes 1 & 2 (2002) |

Singles from Degradation Trip
- 1. "Anger Rising" Released: April 2002; 2. "Angel Eyes" Released: September 2002

Degradation Trip is the second solo album by Alice in Chains guitarist and vocalist Jerry Cantrell, released on June 18, 2002. It marks his difficult transition from Columbia Records to Roadrunner, and was dedicated to Alice in Chains lead singer Layne Staley, who died two months before the album's release. The title was taken from the song "Solitude", the fifth track from the album. Degradation Trip featured two singles and was well received by critics, faring better than Cantrell's solo debut and bearing stronger resemblance to his work in Alice in Chains. The tracks "Anger Rising" and "Angel Eyes" were released as singles. "Anger Rising" reached No. 10 on Billboard's Mainstream Rock Tracks and stayed on the chart for 18 weeks. The album has sold 100,000 copies in the U.S. as of December 2002. In April 2019, it was ranked No. 21 on Rolling Stone's "50 Greatest Grunge Albums" list. Degradation Trip was released on vinyl for the first time on January 20, 2017, with a limited edition of 1,500 copies on transparent green vinyl.

The album was the result of an intense writing process that resulted in 25 songs. Cantrell enlisted new bandmates (Faith No More drummer Mike Bordin and then-Ozzy Osbourne/Black Label Society bassist Robert Trujillo) to officially dissociate himself from the incapacitated Alice in Chains and, after being dropped from Columbia, faced a turbulent recording process funded entirely by himself. After a lack of label interest, Cantrell eventually acquired a deal with Roadrunner who requested that he condense the material to 14 tracks. On November 26, 2002, the full Degradation Trip sessions' songs were released in their entirety as Degradation Trip Volumes 1 & 2. Cantrell's backing band for the Degradation Trip tour was Comes with the Fall, featuring Alice in Chains' future co-lead vocalist, William DuVall.

== Background ==
Not long after the April 1998 release of Cantrell's solo debut, Boggy Depot, he began work on a sophomore record which he confidently projected for a mid-'99 release. The majority of this follow-up, later entitled Degradation Trip, was written in the seclusion of a house in the Cascade Mountains. In a state of self-imposed isolation, Cantrell recorded the demos using a four-track recorder and a Gibson Les Paul. In 2002, he detailed the experience of writing the album and its outcome:

"In '98, I locked myself in my house, went out of my mind, and wrote 25 songs. I rarely bathed during that period of writing; I sent out for food; I didn't really venture out of my house in three or four months. It was a hell of an experience. The album is an overview of birth to now. . . Boggy Depot is like kindergarten compared to this. The massive sonic growth from Boggy Depot to Degradation Trip is comparable to the difference between our work in the Alice in Chains albums Facelift to Dirt, which was also a tremendous leap."

"I got into a writing session which lasted for three or four months where I just continued to spew and pour all of this shit out of the depths of myself from every level and aspect of my life. I dealt with a lot of issues that aren't easy for me to verbally get across. I think it's easier for me to do it in a musical venue. But it was the hardest thing I've ever done in my life. I'm glad I did it and I'm glad I went through the experience, but it's certainly something I don't ever want to do again."

Amidst writing a surplus of material between fall 1998 and spring '99, Cantrell showed two of his new songs to Alice in Chains' lead singer Layne Staley, who had been living in seclusion for some time prior and had not worked with Cantrell in some time. Staley contributed to the songs which would become "Get Born Again", a single from Nothing Safe: Best of the Box, and the song "Died". Thus, rather than becoming Cantrell's solo work, this led to their recording by Alice in Chains in 1998, released the following year. They would later be recognized as the final material written by the band with Staley.

When asked about his thoughts on the album in a 2018 interview with Billboard magazine, Cantrell said:

"I was just really fucked up back then to be honest with you, and you can totally hear it on that record. It was done right before I got sober, and it was also done right when I was dealing with the death of my band, and then the unhappy coincidence of Layne passing away right after I released that record. So it was not a good time in my life, and it totally comes across on that record. It does strike a chord with a lot of people. It's a record I don't listen to a lot anymore because of all those things I mentioned. And I sobered up a year after Layne passed. But it's a record that's important to me, and I'll see Robert and Mike every once in a while and they're like, "We should do some fucking shows, man. Some Degradation Trip shows." (laughs) I tell him we'll do it someday."

== Recording and production ==
By April 2000, Cantrell already had over 30 songs written, so he put aside his confinement and began to search for a band to begin the recording process of Degradation Trip. To continue developing his second solo album, Cantrell enlisted drummer Mike Bordin and bassist Robert Trujillo of Ozzy Osbourne (and later Metallica). The choice would deliberately refrain Cantrell from his Alice in Chains bandmates and therefore distinguish his solo career from his past. He originally booked studio time with Dave Jerden, who produced Alice in Chains' first two albums; however, Cantrell fired him after two days, claiming "It was just not working out personally... Mike and Robert had hooked up with me and we had been through rehearsals, and we got into the studio with Dave and it all blew up on us on the second day. It took us months to get regrouped again." Cantrell was unable to find a replacement for Jerden and decided to self-produce Degradation Trip with his friend Jeff Tomei. They waited another three months for Bordin and Trujillo to become available again, but Cantrell found himself losing Columbia Records' approval of the project. As soon as recording began, his contract with Sony, parent to Columbia, had ended, leaving him with staggering studio bills. He continued financing it on his own, even mortgaging his house to do so, and developed the album to its completion without label interference. Cantrell reflected in early 2002 on his time making a record without a label:

"It was very strange for me, because my experience in this business has been with one band and one label. The last couple years I was not only on my own making a record of the magnitude that I committed myself to, but I was having to deal with being like a brand new artist going around to all these different labels and meeting with them and hearing the same things over and over: 'Yeah, we love it. We love you,' and then have nothing happen. It was a little disheartening after a while."

Trujillo noted the difficulty in re-recording Cantrell's "little hoodrat demos". He was asked to replicate the demo arrangements which were on cassette and, according to Trujillo, had nearly indistinguishable bass. It resulted that Trujillo, inspired by Pino Palladino, developed his own code for writing down bass compositions which he would continue using in the future. However, he remarked positively on his recording experience with Cantrell: "I was primarily just there to enhance the bass, but he taught me a lot about simplicity and using space and notes that really mean something to a song."

Finally, he was picked up by Roadrunner who insisted Cantrell narrow his solo work to 14 songs. He was told, however, that the remaining tracks would later be released in some form. Indeed, on November 26, 2002, a second version of the album – considered to be the "definitive" and originally intended version – was released. This limited edition double album includes 11 additional recordings that Roadrunner forced Cantrell to cut, in fear that a double album would have low commercial viability. As such, Cantrell has called the single-disc release the "Reader's Digest version" of Degradation Trip.

"From Boggy [Depot] to this record is like the jump that Alice made from Facelift to Dirt times two, as far as the musical growth goes."

— Jerry Cantrell

== Music and lyrics ==
With its aggressive, metallic approach and dark tones, Degradation Trip more easily compares to Cantrell's previous work in Alice in Chains than that of his more experimental solo debut. A hallmark of Cantrell's style, many unorthodox rhythms and time signatures are exhibited throughout the album as well as heavy use of wah-wah guitar effect and choir-like vocal harmonies.

The album's grungy heaviness is balanced, however, by moody acoustic ballads such as the somber "Angel Eyes". Serene, twangy guitar riffs featured in the likes of "Gone" allude more to Cantrell's Southern roots.

Its lyrics, often haunting and confessional, range from cynical sarcasm to explicitly morbid portrayals. Cantrell vents on the demise of his band and other personal issues with depictions of drug abuse, troubled relationships, and the rocky, hedonistic lifestyle of a musician. The album's title refers to Cantrell's self-imposed isolation and appears in "Solitude", a brooding acoustic track. The lyrical impact of songs such as "Psychotic Break", which also describes Cantrell's seclusion and reflects on deceased friends and family, was only prophetically magnified upon the sudden death of Layne Staley in April 2002.

== Packaging and title ==
The album title comes from a line in the song "Solitude", the fifth track from Degradation Trip.

The album cover was unveiled on April 10, 2002. The artwork was designed by Pascal Brun, and the photographs were shot by Comenius Röthlisberger, both from Team Switzerland. The front cover features a green image of Cantrell's dismembered left arm lying on a green field with guitar strings wrapped around his fingers and attached to the inner side of his elbow, alluding to the movement of playing the guitar. Female body parts are featured on the booklet for each lyric, with the song title tattooed on the skin. The booklet also contains an image of Cantrell lying on the ground bare chested with his eyes and lips upside down, and a dismembered right hand with a 1/4" audio jack (such as that used for guitar cables) replacing the index finger. Pictures of Cantrell alongside Robert Trujillo and Mike Bordin complete the booklet. The back cover has a photo of Cantrell, Trujillo and Bordin in a field, and the dedicatory "This record is dedicated to Layne Staley" above the track listing.

== Promotion and touring ==
Two singles were released off the album, "Anger Rising" and "Angel Eyes". The former debuted in April 2002 and had a music video which gained the album substantial coverage on MTV2. The acoustic ballad "Angel Eyes" surfaced on radio in September. MTV2 also aired short segments of a primitively animated Cantrell discussing various aspects of his music and personal life. Prior to the release of Degradation Trip, "She Was My Girl" appeared on the soundtrack for the film Spider-Man (2002).

With his album still being shopped around to labels, Jerry Cantrell began a national club tour with a show in his new hometown, San Francisco, California, in January 2001. Supported by Comes with the Fall and Swarm, he recruited M.I.R.V. guitarist Bryan Kehoe to join himself, Bordin, and Trujillo on stage. The three bands performed together from March 13 to April 5, 2001.

In support of his new album, Cantrell embarked on a two-month North American solo tour beginning April 20, 2001. In early May, however, he had an accident while playing football after a concert at the Kentucky Derby, broke his left hand and had to undergo reconstructive surgery, which caused the tour to be postponed. Cantrell's first concert after the surgery was at the Key Club in West Hollywood on July 1, 2001.

Comes with the Fall, a young band that Cantrell admired, would continue touring with him into the following year and even participate during his sets, which included both solo work and Alice in Chains songs. The band's vocalist, William DuVall, performed Staley's vocals during Cantrell's sets and would go on to be the lead singer for the reunited Alice in Chains in 2006.

Cantrell, who had recently signed with Roadrunner, performed at the 16th annual South by Southwest music conference in March 2002. In late April, however, it was reported that Cantrell's longtime friend and Alice in Chains bandmate Layne Staley had been found dead in his apartment. Cantrell canceled a show that he was scheduled to perform at Zephyrhills's Livestock Festival on April 28, in order to attend Staley's funeral in Seattle. Cantrell was replaced by heavy metal band Neurotica. However, Cantrell opted not to cancel any further shows, stating, "The shows I played between the time I got the word about Layne and Layne's funeral were very important to me in terms of being able to continue on. It's one of those things where if you take a break and allow things to settle in, it might be harder to get up again." Cantrell later told Pennsylvania's The Times, "It's difficult to do interviews - it's hard to talk about it. I'm just thankful to have a tour and work - something I can focus on." William DuVall elaborated on this emotional period:

"I lost my grandfather in the same week, so Cantrell and I both hit the road with immense personal losses dogging us. There were times on stage—there was one show in Charlotte where it was just so heavy. I’m holding back tears onstage, and Jerry would start crying onstage too a lot at that point, and a lot of times we would just look at each other when we were singing the stuff because it was the only way... it was heavy. I can’t quantify it really in words."

That summer, Cantrell toured with Nickelback, whom he had befriended at a Roadrunner Records Christmas party, and played in select cities with Creed. However, Bordin and Trujillo were occupied recording Ozzy Osbourne's latest album, forcing Comes with the Fall to both perform as Cantrell's band and open for him in October. The solo musician found himself ironically opening for bands that his previous elder group, Alice in Chains, had undeniably influenced. Regarding the tours, Cantrell expressed enthusiasm toward Nickelback, a Canadian band with high admiration for Cantrell. During some shows, Cantrell also joined Nickelback to play the Alice in Chains song "It Ain't Like That" together, as documented on Nickelback's Live at Home DVD. However, Cantrell also noted his annoyance toward Creed's indifference and lack of friendliness while touring with them, he said; "Personally speaking, I had a great time with the Nickelback guys who are actually real guys and a young fuckin’ hot band, the whole vibe of being around that's exciting. The Creed thing was a little more stale. I just didn't find them very personable guys. I was on tour with them for fuckin’ ever and I still hadn't even met em’. When you spend two months together, you generally find some time to fuckin’ say hello or whatever. It was really kinda weird in that respect. I'd never been on a tour that was that fuckin’ stale on a personal level".

Cantrell also took part in Canada's Edgefest. One particularly heated show forced Cantrell to swap places with Sevendust who were having trouble crossing into Canada, and postponed their slot. The sudden inconvenience led to technical problems with Cantrell's set and a rift between the two parties; his guitar shorted out early on, and he later tripped on a microphone cord before angrily ending his set early. Cantrell then gave the crowd a disparaging remark about the upcoming Sevendust. Lajon Witherspoon, frontman of Sevendust, then spoke out during their set: "When Jerry Cantrell says fuck Sevendust, I say fuck you, Jerry Cantrell. I hope you heard me, Jerry Cantrell." However, Sevendust's spokesman soon after claimed that the two parties had apologized over the misunderstanding and that Cantrell was largely just upset over the technical difficulties. Further details revealed that Sevendust's bus broke down on their way to Ontario and that they waited two hours for officers to clear them to cross the border.

After opening for Nickelback and Creed, Cantrell began a headlining tour on October 9. This included Comes with the Fall, Mad at Gravity and Udora as openers.

After an October 23 show in Portland, Oregon, Cantrell passed out from extreme exhaustion and dehydration. This caused the cancellation of two shows in Seattle, Washington, and Colorado Springs, Colorado. He continued touring on October 27.

== Release and reception ==
Professional ratings
Review scores
| Source | Rating |
|---|---|
| AllMusic | 4/5 stars |
| Entertainment Weekly | B+ |
| ultimateguitar.com | 9.8/10 |

Degradation Trip was originally scheduled to be released on May 19, 2002, but the release was pushed back to June 25, and finally pushed forward to June 18.

The album debuted at No. 33 on the Billboard 200 chart, selling more than 31,000 copies. The album stayed on the top 200 for 5 weeks, and sold 100,000 copies as of December 2002.

The album received overwhelmingly positive reviews from various media and stronger enthusiasm than Cantrell's solo debut. Many critics noted that the album holds many similarities to the Alice in Chains sound while also featuring new elements. Its bleak lyrical themes also gained much attention, particularly due to the recent death of Layne Staley.

Months prior to the album's release, Jon Wienhorn of MTV declared it "Cantrell's best and most personal outing since Alice in Chains' last stand, and in many ways the disc takes over where that band left off." Allmusic's Stephen Thomas Erlewine claimed that "serious listeners and longtime fans will [...] appreciate the album as Cantrell's best record since Dirt" and regarded Cantrell as being "on top of [his] game". Sandy Masuo of Rolling Stone considered it less adventurous than Boggy Depot but noted, "There's no happy ending when all is said and done, but it's a more poetic trip than most angst merchants offer these days, and for that reason alone it's a journey worth taking." Blender's J.D. Considine similarly praised Cantrell's lyrics: "For all the overdubbed vocals and layered guitars, it’s the writing, not the arranging, that carries this album. Cantrell creates songs, not just riffs, and Degradation Trip is packed with memorable melodies and strikingly vivid lyrics."

== Track listing ==
All tracks are written by Jerry Cantrell.

| No. | Title | Length |
|---|---|---|
| 1. | "Psychotic Break" | 4:08 |
| 2. | "Bargain Basement Howard Hughes" | 5:38 |
| 3. | "Anger Rising" | 6:14 |
| 4. | "Angel Eyes" | 4:44 |
| 5. | "Solitude" | 4:00 |
| 6. | "Mother's Spinning in Her Grave (Glass Dick Jones)" | 3:54 |
| 7. | "Hellbound" | 6:45 |
| 8. | "Give It a Name" | 4:02 |
| 9. | "Castaway" | 4:59 |
| 10. | "She Was My Girl" | 3:59 |
| 11. | "Chemical Tribe" | 6:35 |
| 12. | "Spiderbite" | 6:38 |
| 13. | "Locked On" | 5:36 |
| 14. | "Gone" | 5:06 |
| Total length: | | 72:30 |

== Personnel ==
- Jerry Cantrell – guitar, vocals, production
- Robert Trujillo – bass guitar
- Mike Bordin – drums
- Chris DeGarmo – additional guitar on "Anger Rising"
- Walter Earl – additional percussion

Production

- Produced by Jerry Cantrell and Jeff Tomei
- Mixed by Jeff Tomei at A&M Studios
- Recorded by Jeff Tomei and Tim Harkins, assisted by Jaime Sikora
- Mastered by George Marino at Sterling Sound, NYC
- Artwork and photography by Team Switzerland (Pascal Brun and Comenius Röthlisberger)
- Drum tech – Walter Earl
- Guitar tech – Brett Allen

== Charts ==
=== Album ===
Chart performance for Degradation Trip
| Chart (2002) | Peak position |
|---|---|
| Australian Albums (ARIA) | 85 |
| US Billboard Top 200 | 33 |

=== Singles ===
Chart performance of singles from Degradation Trip
| Year | Single | Chart | Peak position |
|---|---|---|---|
| 2002 | "Anger Rising" | US Mainstream Rock Tracks | 10 |
