= The Osbourne Family Album =

Compilation album by Various Artists
- Released: 12 June 2002
- Genre: Rock
- Length: 57:00
- Label: Epic
- Producers: Sharon Osbourne; Kelly Osbourne; Jack Osbourne; Ozzy Osbourne

Ozzy Osbourne chronology
Down to Earth (2001)	The Osbourne Family Album (2002)	Live at Budokan (2002)

The Osbourne Family Album was a various artists compilation album based on the television series The Osbournes with the songs selected by the family. It included the theme song "Crazy Train" (Pat Boone's version) as well as contributions by Ozzy and Kelly. The songs were interspersed with dialogue from the show. The odd number tracks are dialogue from the show while the even number tracks are songs. Released on 12 June 2002, it was dedicated to family member Aimee who chose not to participate in the television show. The album was released during the second season of the series. The album received a parental advisory sticker for the dialogue tracks, which contain profanity. A clean version of the album was also released, which censors out the profanity with bleeps.

== Track listing ==
1. Dialogue
2. "Crazy Train" - Pat Boone
3. Dialogue
4. "Dreamer" - Ozzy Osbourne
5. Dialogue
6. "Papa Don't Preach" - Kelly Osbourne
7. Dialogue
8. "You Really Got Me" - The Kinks
9. Dialogue
10. "Snowblind" - System of a Down
11. Dialogue
12. "Imagine" - John Lennon
13. Dialogue
14. "Drive" - The Cars
15. Dialogue
16. "Good Souls" - Starsailor
17. Dialogue
18. "Mirror Image" - Dillusion
19. Dialogue
20. "Wonderful Tonight" - Eric Clapton
21. Dialogue
22. "Mama, I'm Coming Home" - Ozzy Osbourne
23. Dialogue
24. "Crazy Train" - Ozzy Osbourne
25. Dialogue
26. "Family System" - Chevelle
27. Dialogue

NOTE: The album's packaging does not list the dialogue tracks.
