= Gets Me Through =

Single by Ozzy Osbourne

from the album Down to Earth
- B-side: "No Place for Angels"
- Released: 4 September 2001
- Recorded: 2000
- Genre: Heavy metal
- Length: 5:04; 4:09 (single version)
- Label: Sony Records
- Songwriters: Ozzy Osbourne; Tim Palmer
- Producer: Tim Palmer

Ozzy Osbourne singles chronology
"Back on Earth" (1997)	"Gets Me Through" (2001)	"Dreamer" (2002)

Music video
- "Gets Me Through" on YouTube

"Gets Me Through" is a song by English heavy metal singer Ozzy Osbourne from his 2001 album Down to Earth. It is both the opening track and lead single from the album. The song opens with the lyrics "I'm not the kind of person you think I am/I'm not the Antichrist or the Iron Man", explaining that Osbourne's stage persona is not his actual personality. The song's lyrics also feature Osbourne telling his fans that their appreciation "gets (him) through", hence the title.

The single peaked at number eighteen on the UK Singles Chart and number two on Billboard's Mainstream Rock Tracks chart. In Metal Edge magazine's 2001 Readers' Choice Awards, it won "Music Video of the Year" and tied with Slipknot's "Left Behind" for "Song of the Year."

== Music video ==
Two versions of the video exist. The first version was banned from MTV, due to it featuring images of flames, destruction, and a room of doves being killed and bleeding to death. The video was re-edited following the September 11 attacks, removing most of the flames and destruction, as well as editing the dove scenes, though a clip featuring a television set exploding was not removed.

In the video, Osbourne is seen walking down a hallway where he is being monitored by surveillance cameras and walking past several rooms of random things, (i.e., a dove covered in blood, footage of his concerts, etc.). At the end of the video, Ozzy is opening another door.

The band is seen playing in a different room.

== Personnel ==
- Ozzy Osbourne - vocals
- Zakk Wylde - guitar
- Robert Trujillo - bass
- Mike Bordin - drums
- Tim Palmer - keyboards

Music Video

Director: Jonas Åkerlund

== Charts ==
=== Weekly charts ===
Chart (2001–2002)	Peak position
Canada (Nielsen SoundScan)	36
Germany (GfK)	89
Sweden (Sverigetopplistan)	27
UK Singles (OCC)	18
US Mainstream Rock (Billboard)	2
