= How to Write Love Songs =

Studio album by Mass Mental?
- Released: 1999
- Length: 34:53
- Label: Zain
- Producer: Mark Dodson

Mass Mental? chronology
How to Write Love Songs (1999)	Live in Tokyo (2000)

Professional ratings
Review scores
Source	Rating
Kerrang!	3/5 stars

How to Write Love Songs is the only studio album of the short lived rock supergroup Mass Mental? It was released solely in Japan, and has only gained attention worldwide due to internet uploads and imported CDs. A limited run was released in March 2016.

== Background ==
Mass Mental came into being in 1998 after bassist Robert Trujillo, then of Suicidal Tendencies, began auditioning for a new side project. There he met up with Welsh musician Benji Webbe, whose ragga-punk outfit Dub War had just disbanded following poor sales of their second album and disputes with Earache Records, who had also refused Webbe a solo album. The group was rounded out with second bassist Armand Sabal-Lecco and drummer Brooks Wackerman. Skindred guitarist Mikey Demus claims that the late Snot frontman Lynn Strait performed on the album in one of his final recordings before his death. The album was released in Japan in memory of Lynn.

== Track List ==
No.	Title	Length
1.	"Bounce" (co-written by Danny Carbonel)	4:47
2.	"Go Mexican Go"	4:34
3.	"Frog Stomp"	3:05
4.	"Circus"	1:19
5.	"Speedmental"	4:09
6.	"I Win"	4:34
7.	"Bad Vibes"	2:41
8.	"Mazzmental"	3:32
9.	"Lifeline"	4:05
10.	"Kill Ya"	2:02
Total length:		34:53

== Personnel ==
Mass Mental?

- Benji Webbe - vocals
- Robert Trujillo - bass guitar, mixing
- Armand Sabal-Lecco - bass guitar
- Brooks Wackerman - drums, vocals on Speedmental

Additional Personnel

- Roy Mayorga - drums, percussion
- Lynn Strait - vocals
- Danny Carbonel - vocals on Bounce
- Joey Castillo - "additional beats" on Frog Stomp
- John Wackerman - "Great Vibes" on I Win
- Danny Reyes - percussion on I Win
- Rick Battson - "Electric Mierda (Caca)" on Bad Vibes
- Stephen Perkins - drums on Lifeline
- Joey Klparda - percussion on Lifeline
- Whitfield Crane - growls on Kill Ya
- Cover artwork by Pascal Brun, Comenius Röthlisberger and Boris Zatko (TeamSwitzerland.com)
- Mark Dodson - production, engineering, mixing
- Mark Casselman - mastering, additional engineering, additional mixing
- D. Dunn - mixing
- Dave Draper - remastering (2016 "Ghetto Bootleg Edition" remaster)
