= Dreamer (Ozzy Osbourne song) =

2001 single by Ozzy Osbourne

Single by Ozzy Osbourne

from the album Down to Earth
- Released: 2001
- Length: 4:45 (album version); 4:33 (acoustic version)
- Label: Epic
- Songwriters: Ozzy Osbourne; Marti Frederiksen; Mick Jones
- Producer: Tim Palmer

Ozzy Osbourne singles chronology
"Gets Me Through" (2001)	"Dreamer" (2001)	"Mississippi Queen" (2005)

Music video
- "Dreamer" on YouTube

"Dreamer" is the third track from English singer-songwriter Ozzy Osbourne's album Down to Earth, which was released in 2001. The single peaked at number 10 on the US Billboard Mainstream Rock Tracks chart. The song describes the rockstar's vision of people and humanity destroying Earth. In the liner notes to Osbourne's Prince of Darkness box set, Ozzy refers to this song as his version of John Lennon's "Imagine".

The Japanese and European press of the single also include a slightly different version of the song, dubbed "Dreamer (acoustic)", and a previously unreleased song titled "Black Skies", which was intended as the theme song for the video game Savage Skies—initially announced under the title Ozzy's Black Skies—until it was reworked and released without the Osbourne branding.

== Music video ==
The video shows Osbourne in two different locations: in a snowy forest, with shades of blue, where children play some instruments that can be heard in the music, such as violin and piano; and in a candlelit building, with shades of red, in which his band are. The video was directed by Rob Zombie.

== Personnel ==
- Ozzy Osbourne – lead vocals
- Zakk Wylde – guitar
- Robert Trujillo – bass guitar
- Mike Bordin – drums
- Tim Palmer – keyboards

== Charts ==
=== Weekly charts ===
Chart (2002–2003)	Peak position
Austria (Ö3 Austria Top 40)	2
Canada (Nielsen SoundScan)	40
Denmark (Tracklisten)	3
Europe (Eurochart Hot 100)	9
Finland (Suomen virallinen lista)	13
Germany (GfK)	2
Ireland (IRMA)	24
Netherlands (Dutch Top 40)	19
Netherlands (Single Top 100)	15
Switzerland (Schweizer Hitparade)	10
UK Singles (Official Charts)	18
US Mainstream Rock Airplay (Billboard)	10

Chart (2023–2025)	Peak position
Czech Republic Singles Digital (ČNS IFPI)	16
Finland Airplay (Radiosoittolista)	85
Norway (IFPI Norge)	68
Sweden Heatseeker (Sverigetopplistan)	2

=== Year-end charts ===
Chart (2002)	Position
Austria (Ö3 Austria Top 40)	27
Europe (Eurochart Hot 100)	48
Germany (Media Control)	14
Switzerland (Schweizer Hitparade)	74

== Certifications ==
Region	Certification	Certified units/sales
Austria (IFPI Austria)	Gold	20,000^{*}
Denmark (IFPI Danmark)	Gold	7,500
Denmark (IFPI Danmark) Reissue	Gold	45,000^{‡}
New Zealand (RMNZ)	Gold	15,000^{‡}
Germany (BVMI)	Gold	250,000^{^}
^{*} Sales figures based on certification alone.^{^} Shipments figures based on certification alone.^{‡} Sales+streaming figures based on certification alone.
