= Angel Eyes (Jerry Cantrell song) =

2002 single by Jerry Cantrell

Single by Jerry Cantrell

from the album Degradation Trip
- Released: September 2002
- Recorded: 2000
- Studio: A&M Studios in Hollywood, CA; Master Control in Burbank, CA; Music Grinder Studios in West Hollywood, CA
- Genre: Alternative rock
- Length: 4:44
- Label: Roadrunner
- Songwriter: Jerry Cantrell
- Producers: Jerry Cantrell, Jeff Tomei

Jerry Cantrell singles chronology
"Anger Rising" (2002)	"Angel Eyes" (2002)	"A Job to Do" (2017)

"Angel Eyes" is a song by American rock musician Jerry Cantrell. It was the second and final single from his 2002 solo album, Degradation Trip. The track made its radio debut in September 2002.

== Release and reception ==
The single made its radio debut in September 2002.

MTV's Joe D'Angelo said about "Angel Eyes": "The gentle, melodic song is to AiC's "No Excuses" as Degradation's first single, the ominous "Anger Rising", was to "Again", from AIC's eponymous 1995 LP".

== Track listing ==
No.	Title	Length
1.	"Angel Eyes (Edit)"	3:52
2.	"Angel Eyes (Album Version)"	4:44

== Personnel ==
- Jerry Cantrell – vocals, lead guitar
- Robert Trujillo – bass guitar
- Mike Bordin – drums
