= Westgate Under Fire =

Studio album by Dub War
- Released: 5 August 2022
- Recorded: 2016–2022
- Genre: Reggae; punk rock; Ragga metal
- Length: 47:45
- Label: Earache
- Producer: Richard "Action" Jackson

Dub War chronology
Wrong Side of Beautiful (1996)	Westgate Under Fire (2022)

Singles from Westgate Under Fire
- 1. "Fun Done" Released: 2 March 2016; 2. "Blackkk Man" Released: 2 March 2022; 3. "War Inna Babylon" Released: 13 April 2022

Westgate Under Fire ratings
Review scores
Source	Rating
Kerrang!	4/5
Louder Sound	3.5/5 stars

Westgate Under Fire is the third studio album by Welsh ragga metal band Dub War, released on 5 August 2022 via Earache Records. It is the first album of new material by the band since Wrong Side of Beautiful in 1996.

== Background ==
After their split in 1999, 3/4 of the band went on to form Skindred, however only frontman Benji Webbe remained by 2004. In 2014, the group reunited for a limited number of shows with Mikee Gregory on live drums. This was followed in March 2016 with the single "Fun Done" and "Making a Monster" in October that year. This was initially planned to be part of a series of singles that would eventually culminate in a full album through independent label Saint Ringland Records.

However, these plans eventually fell through until 2022, when the group announced Westgate Under Fire, inspired by the events of the Newport Rising, and important moment in the Chartist movement. The group reunited with Earache Records to release the album, and recruited a host of drummers to perform on the album alongside Gregory. The first single, "Blackkk Man", was released on 2 March 2022. The track was inspired by the murder of George Floyd and subsequent protests. Previous stand-alone single "Fun Done" is included on the album, while "Making a Monster" was renamed "Mary Shelley".

== Track listing ==
All tracks are written by Benji Webbe, Jeff Rose and Richie Glover.

Westgate Under Fire track listing
No.	Title	Length
1.	"Blackkk Man"	3:30
2.	"War Inna Babylon" (Max Romeo and The Upsetters cover, featuring Ranking Roger)	3:41
3.	"Vibes in the Place"	3:48
4.	"Art of War" (featuring Spike T. Smith)	2:11
5.	"Reveal It" (featuring Roy Mayorga)	4:50
6.	"Mary Shelley"	4:13
7.	"Bite Back" (featuring Dave Chavarri)	3:18
8.	"Coffin Lid"	3:52
9.	"Crying Clowns" (featuring Jamie Miller and Mikey Doling)	3:18
10.	"Get Back Up" (featuring Mike Bordin)	3:55
11.	"Fun Done"	3:29
12.	"Stay Together" (Al Green cover)	4:19
13.	"Celtic Cross" (featuring Tanner Wayne)	3:21
Total length:		47:45

== Personnel ==
Dub War

- Benji Webbe – vocals
- Jeff Rose – guitars
- Richie Glover – bass guitar

Additional musicians

- Mikee Gregory – drums
- Ranking Roger – vocals on "War Inna Babylon"
- Spike T. Smith – drums on "Art of War"
- Roy Mayorga – drums on "Reveal It"
- Dave Chavarri – drums on "Bite Back"
- Jamie Miller – drums on "Crying Clowns"
- Mikey Doling – guitar on "Crying Clowns"
- Mike Bordin – drums on "Get Back Up"
- Tanner Wayne – drums on "Celtic Cross"

Production

- Richard "Action" Jackson – production, mixing
- Rick Will – mastering
- Lord Hagos
- Bryan "Chuck" New

Artwork

- Artcore – album cover art

== Charts ==
Chart performance for Westgate Under Fire
Chart (2022)	Peak position
Scottish Albums (OCC)	27
UK Albums (OCC)	49
UK Independent Albums (OCC)	2
UK Rock & Metal Albums (OCC)	1
