= Live at Budokan (Ozzy Osbourne album) =

Live album by Ozzy Osbourne

Live album by Ozzy Osbourne
- Released: 25 June 2002
- Recorded: 15 February 2002
- Venues: Nippon Budokan, Tokyo, Japan
- Genre: Heavy metal
- Length: 66:27
- Label: Epic
- Producers: Thom Panunzio; Ozzy Osbourne; Sharon Osbourne

Ozzy Osbourne chronology
The Osbourne Family Album (2002)	Live at Budokan (2002)	The Essential Ozzy Osbourne (2003)

Live at Budokan

Video by Ozzy Osbourne
- Released: 25 June 2002
- Recorded: 15 February 2002
- Venues: Nippon Budokan, Tokyo, Japan
- Genre: Heavy metal
- Length: 84 min (approx.) (concert) / 36 minutes (approx.) (documentary)
- Label: Epic
- Director: Jeb Brien
- Producers: Jeb Brien, Sharon Osbourne, Allen Kelman

Ozzy Osbourne video chronology
Gets Me Through (2001)	Live at Budokan (2002)	The Essential (2008)

Professional ratings
Review scores
Source	Rating
AllMusic	3/5 stars
Rolling Stone	3/5 stars

Live at Budokan is a live album and video by heavy metal singer Ozzy Osbourne. It was recorded at the Nippon Budokan on 15 February 2002 in Tokyo, Japan, and released on 25 June 2002.

The DVD is largely shot in widescreen, except for the drum cam behind Mike Bordin that is pointed towards the audience, which is shot in 4:3. The picture format is standard 4:3 aspect, with letterboxing for all of the widescreen shots. The DVD also contains bonus The Osbournes styled features.

The DVD also features the song "Suicide Solution" and Zakk Wylde's accompanying guitar solo. Running in excess of 13 minutes, this track was cut from the CD version because of time constraints.

== Track listings ==
=== CD ===
No.	Title	Writer(s)	Length
1.	"I Don't Know"	Ozzy Osbourne, Randy Rhoads, Bob Daisley	5:51
2.	"That I Never Had"	Osbourne, Joe Holmes, Robert Trujillo, Marti Frederiksen	4:12
3.	"Believer"	Osbourne, Rhoads, Daisley, Lee Kerslake	4:56
4.	"Junkie"	Osbourne, Holmes, Trujillo, Frederiksen	4:16
5.	"Mr. Crowley"	Osbourne, Rhoads, Daisley	6:44
6.	"Gets Me Through"	Osbourne, Tim Palmer	4:15
7.	"No More Tears"	Osbourne, Zakk Wylde, Mike Inez, Randy Castillo, John Purdell	7:13
8.	"I Don't Want to Change the World"	Osbourne, Wylde, Castillo, Lemmy Kilmister	4:14
9.	"Road to Nowhere"	Osbourne, Wylde, Castillo	5:52
10.	"Crazy Train"	Osbourne, Rhoads, Daisley	5:56
11.	"Mama, I'm Coming Home"	Osbourne, Wylde, Lemmy	4:37
12.	"Bark at the Moon"	Osbourne, Jake E. Lee, Daisley	4:29
13.	"Paranoid"	Osbourne, Tony Iommi, Geezer Butler, Bill Ward	3:49
Total length:			1:06:24

=== DVD ===
No.	Title	Writer(s)	Length
1.	"I Don't Know"	Ozzy Osbourne, Randy Rhoads, Bob Daisley	5:45
2.	"That I Never Had"	Osbourne, Joe Holmes, Robert Trujillo, Marti Frederiksen	4:24
3.	"Believer"	Osbourne, Rhoads, Daisley, Lee Kerslake	5:28
4.	"Junkie"	Osbourne, Holmes, Trujillo, Frederiksen	4:34
5.	"Mr. Crowley"	Osbourne, Rhoads, Daisley	6:58
6.	"Gets Me Through"	Osbourne, Tim Palmer	5:19
7.	"Suicide Solution"	Osbourne, Rhoads, Daisley	14:34
8.	"No More Tears"	Osbourne, Zakk Wylde, Mike Inez, Randy Castillo, John Purdell	7:35
9.	"I Don't Want to Change the World"	Osbourne, Wylde, Castillo, Lemmy Kilmister	4:11
10.	"Road to Nowhere"	Osbourne, Wylde, Castillo	6:09
11.	"Crazy Train"	Osbourne, Rhoads, Daisley	6:05
12.	"Mama, I'm Coming Home"	Osbourne, Wylde, Lemmy	5:06

Encores
No.	Title	Writer(s)	Length
13.	"Bark at the Moon"	Osbourne, Jake E. Lee, Daisley	5:12
14.	"Paranoid"	Osbourne, Tony Iommi, Geezer Butler, Bill Ward	4:02
Total length:			1:24:23

== Personnel ==
- Ozzy Osbourne – vocals, producer
- Zakk Wylde – guitars
- Robert Trujillo – bass
- Mike Bordin – drums
- John Sinclair – keyboards

Production

- Thom Panunzio - producer, engineer, mixing
- German Villacorta - engineer, mixing
- Yoshiyasu Kumada,live engineer
- Stewart Whitmore - digital editing
- Stephen Marcussen - mastering
- Sharon Osbourne - executive producer

== Charts ==
=== Weekly charts ===
Chart (2002)	Peak position
Austrian Albums (Ö3 Austria)	38
German Albums (Offizielle Top 100)	55
Swedish Albums (Sverigetopplistan)	45
US Billboard 200	70

=== Year-end charts ===
Year-end chart performance for Live at Budokan by Ozzy Osbourne
Chart (2002)	Position
Canadian Metal Albums (Nielsen SoundScan)	71

== Certifications ==
Video

Region	Certification	Certified units/sales
United States (RIAA)	Gold	50,000^{^}
^{^} Shipments figures based on certification alone.

500,000*
