= Jaco (film) =

- Official poster from the worldwide premiere in Los Angeles, California
- Directed by: Paul Marchand, Stephen Kijak
- Written by: Paul Marchand, Robert Trujillo
- Produced by: Robert Trujillo, John Battsek
- Starring: Jaco Pastorius, Sting, Bootsy Collins, Flea, Joni Mitchell, Jerry Jemmott, Wayne Shorter, Herbie Hancock, Carlos Santana Geddy Lee
- Cinematography: Roger de Giacomi
- Edited by: Paul Marchand
- Music by: Jaco Pastorius
- Production companies: Passion Pictures, Slang East/West
- Release date: November 22, 2014
- Running time: 110 minutes
- Country: United States
- Language: English

Jaco is a 2014 American documentary that depicts the life and death of jazz musician Jaco Pastorius. The film was directed by Paul Marchand and Stephen Kijak and produced by Robert Trujillo of Metallica and John Battsek of Passion Pictures.

The film features interviews with Herbie Hancock, Wayne Shorter, Sting, Joni Mitchell, Carlos Santana, Jerry Jemmott, Jonas Hellborg, Bootsy Collins, Geddy Lee, and Flea.

== Reception ==
The New York Times called Jaco "an illuminating, compassionate new documentary." Decider pronounced it "an engaging and interesting documentary" albeit about a "musician’s musician" which could limit its appeal. Bassist Billy Sheehan felt that it was "a wonderful film" but opined that "I think, maybe, it might have concentrated on some eccentricities a little bit more than it could have."
