= Mass Mental =

American rock band

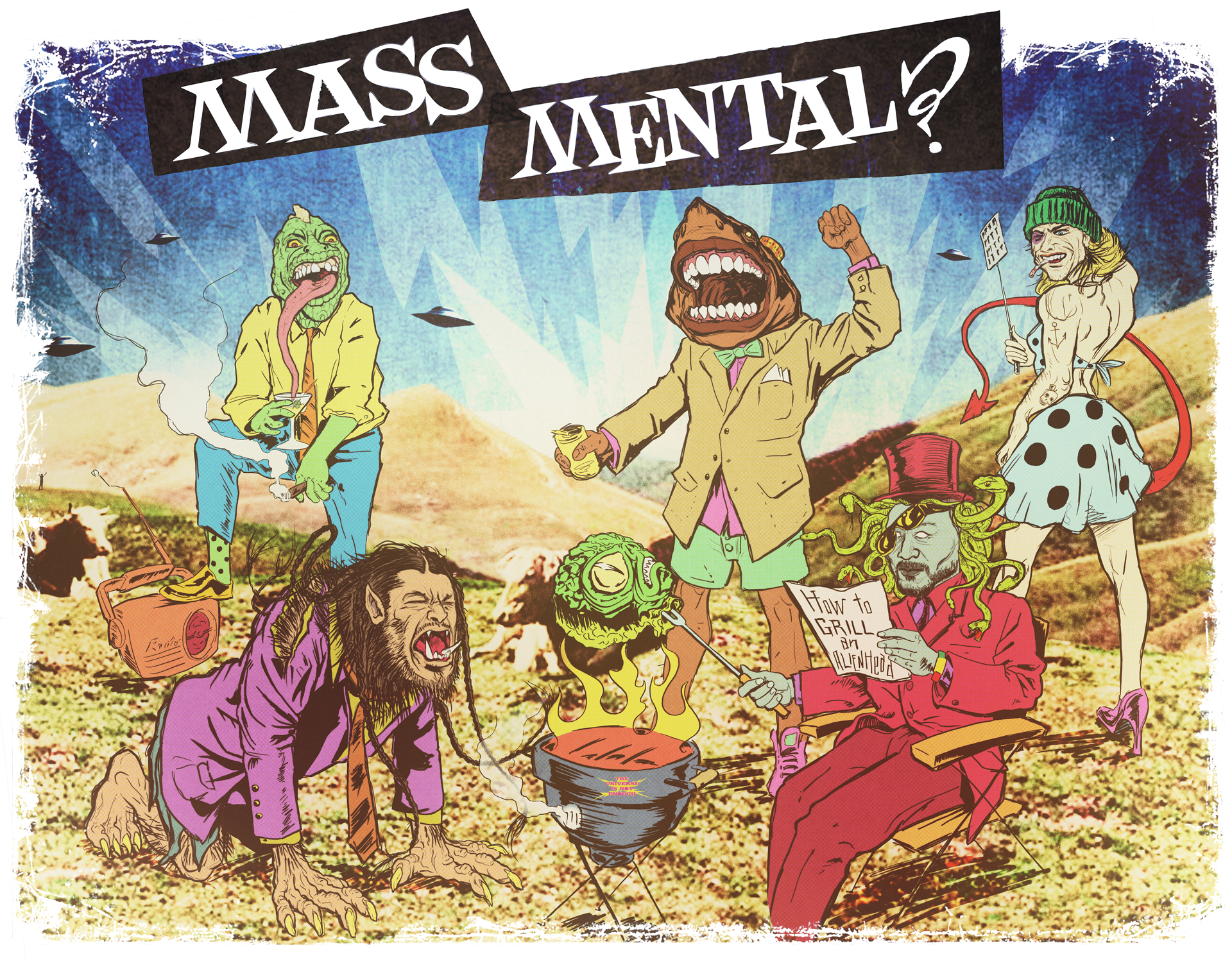
- Official band picture of Mass Mental by "The Universe is not Enough" (Pascal Brun and Marcel Szerdahelyi)

Background information
- Origin: United States
- Years active: 1995–present
- Label: Zain
- Members: Benji Webbe; Robert Trujillo; Armand Sabal-Lecco; Whitfield Crane; Brooks Wackerman
- Past members: Roy Mayorga

Mass Mental (also stylized as Mass Mental?) is an American rock band. It was formed in 1995 by former Suicidal Tendencies and current Metallica bassist Robert Trujillo and former Dub War and current Skindred singer Clive "Benji" Webbe.

== History ==
The band was formed when Webbe's band Dub War disbanded after a dispute with their record label, Earache Records, and Webbe had failed to persuade them to let him record a hip-hop solo album. Trujillo was working with Ozzy Osbourne at the time. He recruited Armand Sabal-Lecco as a second bassist and Brooks Wackerman on drums to perform on Mass Mental's only album, How to Write Love Songs, which had begun work in 1995 with producer Mark Dodson and a selection of other musicians. Mikey Demus of Skindred has also claimed that Roy Mayorga of Soulfly and Stone Sour also played on some tracks, as well as Whitfield Crane and Lynn Strait providing some vocals (believed to be Strait's last recording). A music video was made for Speedmental, but was scrapped due to Brooks Wackerman's explicit lyrics.

The band spawned a studio album, How to Write Love Songs, and a live album in Tokyo both released in Japan only, before disbanding shortly afterwards. The band were briefly together in 2002 with Roy Mayorga on drums and spent time at the home studio of Jonathan Davis to record a follow-up with producer Tim Harkins, however nothing materialised.

=== After Mass Mental ===
The group members each went their separate ways, with Webbe forming "ragga metal" band Skindred who released six studio albums; Trujillo going on to join Metallica in 2003 where he remains to this day; and Brooks Wackerman working with Bad Religion, Tenacious D, Fear and the Nervous System, and, for a brief time in 2007, Korn. Brooks Wackerman currently is the drummer for the Rock band "Avenged Sevenfold". In 2012, an official Facebook page started, in which pictures from the recording sessions were posted as well as artwork and other things. A release of the "Santa Barbara" mixes of the album was scheduled and a concert in September was rumoured only to be cancelled due to each member's touring schedules. Despite this, Mass Mental has claimed that it is still an ongoing project. Trujillo and Wackerman have also been involved with Farmikos, led by Trujillo's former Ozzy Osbourne bandmate, guitarist Joe Holmes, although neither is an official band member.

=== Reunion ===
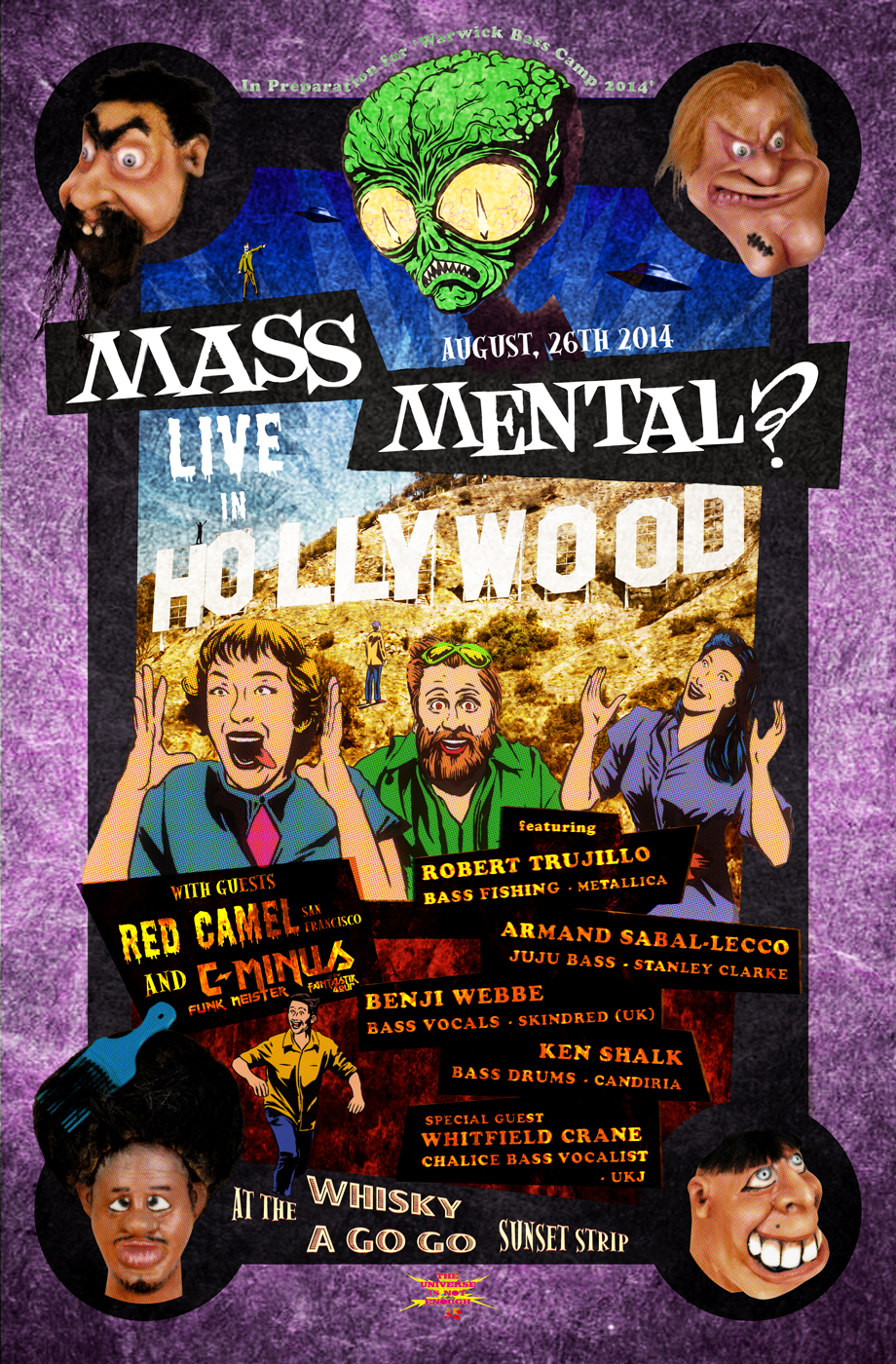
Gig Poster of the Mass Mental show at the Whisky a Go Go by "The Universe is Not Enough" (Marcel Szerdahelyi & Pascal Brun)

After a surprise "instruMENTAL" show supporting Tenacious D in 2013, the group reunited for a series of shows in summer 2014, with Ken Schalk replacing Brooks Wackerman on drums due to Wackerman's other commitments. In preparation of the Warwick & Framus Open Day 2014 Mass Mental played a show at the legendary Whisky a Go Go in Hollywood on August 26, 2014. On September 6, 2014 the group headlined the Warwick & Framus Open Day 2014 in Markneukirchen, Germany. The next official show was at the Lollapalooza Chile festival in Santiago de Chile in March 2015. The touring lineup also included DJ C-Minus and ex-God Forbid guitarist Doc Coyle providing additional guitars.

In August 2015, the group posted images on their Facebook page of Trujillo and Sabal-Leco in the studio, working on a new album.

On March 12, 2016, the group performed at the London Bass Guitar Show at Olympia (London) with a number of special guests, including English bassist Mark King. They also released a limited run of 150 copies of How to Write Love Songs for the shows, with the remainder going up for sale online.

== Members ==
(known participants on "How to Write Love Songs" only, according to interviews and the band's Facebook page)

=== Current members ===
- Benji Webbe – lead vocals (1995–present)
- Robert Trujillo – bass guitar (1995–present)
- Armand Sabal-Lecco – bass guitar (1995–present)
- Brooks Wackerman – drums, vocals (1998–present)
- Whitfield Crane – vocals (1998–present)

==== Touring members ====
- Stevie Salas – additional guitar (2014–present)

=== Former members/contributors ===
==== Vocalists ====
- Lynn Strait (1998)
- Danny Carbonel (1998)

==== Drummers ====
- Stephen Perkins (1998)
- Roy Mayorga (2000–2002)
- Ken Schalk (2014)
- Brant Bjork (2016)

==== Percussionists ====
- Daniel de los Reyes – percussion (1998)
- Joey Klparda – percussion (1998)

==== Other ====
- Joey Castillo – additional beats (1998)
- Rick Battson (1998)
- John Wackerman (1998)
- Mark King – bass guitar (2016)
- Doc Coyle – additional guitar (2014)
- C-Minus – DJ, turntables (2014–2015)

==== Guitarists ====
- Phil Campbell – guitar (2016)
- Sagat Guirey – guitar (2016)

== Discography ==
- How to Write Love Songs (1999)
- Live in Tokyo (2000)
- Come on Over (single) (2015)
