= Benji Webbe =

Welsh singer (born 1967)

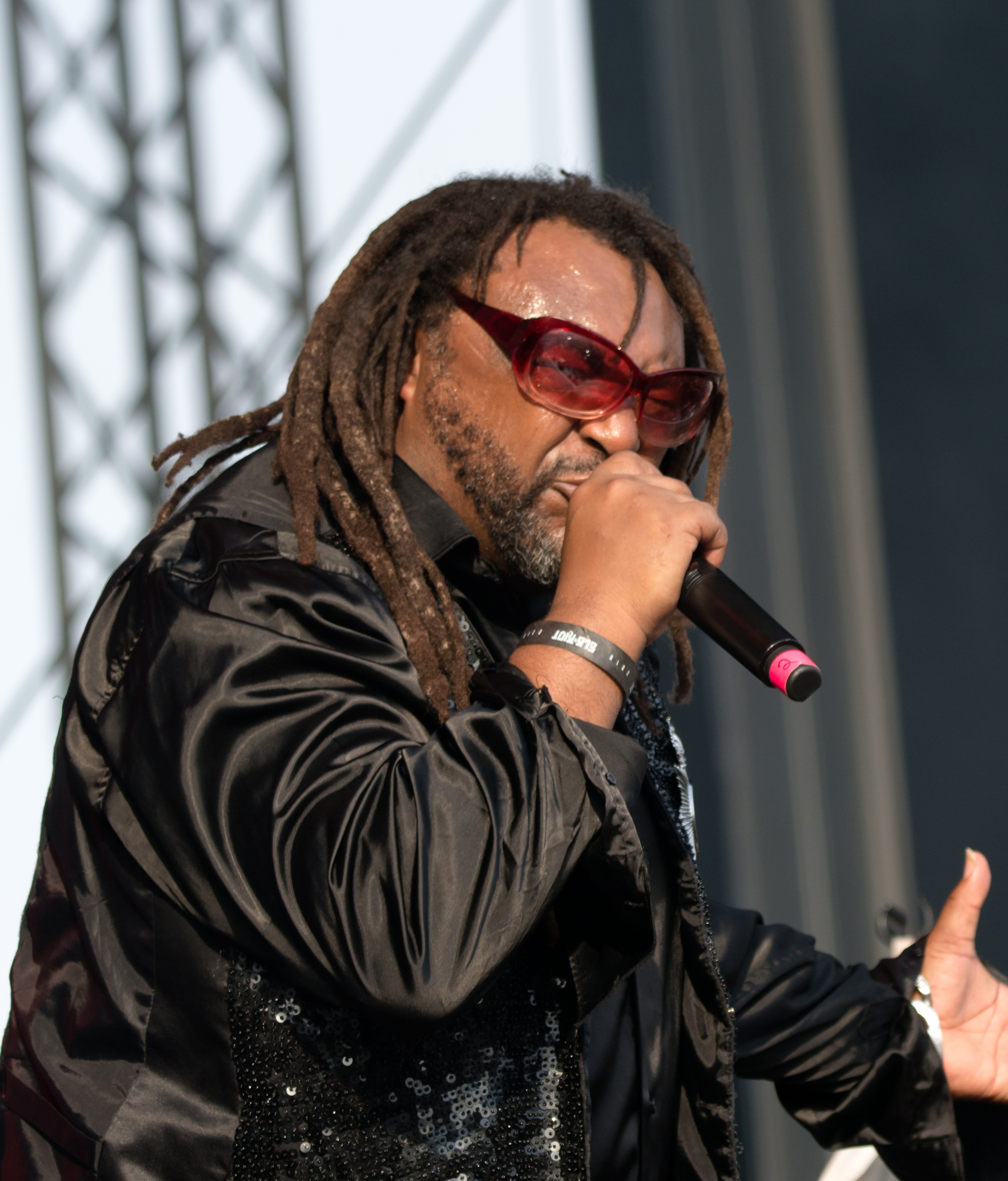
- Webbe performing with Skindred in 2018

Background information
- Also known as: CJ Webbe; The DirtyDred
- Born: Clive John Webbe; 11 March 1967 (age 59); Newport, Wales
- Genres: Nu metal; ragga; alternative metal; punk rock; reggae; hardcore punk; blues
- Occupation: Singer
- Years active: 1993–present
- Member of: Mass Mental; Dub War; Skindred; Diamond Spider
- Website: skindred.net

Clive John "Benji" Webbe (born 11 March 1967) is a Welsh singer, best known as the lead vocalist for the reggae metal band Skindred. Aside from his main project, he is also active in Diamond Spider, Dub War, Mass Mental and his own solo project. He has featured on albums by Bullet for My Valentine, Soulfly, The Alarm, and Punk Rock Factory.

Webbe is a native of Newport, South Wales, and a veteran of the rock explosion of the mid-1990s which led to Spin magazine dubbing Newport as 'The New Seattle'.

== Early life ==
Clive John Webbe was born on 11 March 1967 in Newport to Caribbean parents. His father, originally from St Kitts and Nevis, was brought to the UK on the Windrush ship which brought one of the first groups of West Indian immigrants to the United Kingdom. His father arrived in Manchester where he struggled to find a job and moved to Wales instead.

Webbe became an orphan at the age of 13 and was raised by his older brother in Newport. He was also involved in drug dealing, but turned his life around with music.

== Career ==
Webbe was first inspired to perform music after attending a performance by his brother's band. His first group was a sound system called Conqueror Hi Power, before joining the band Bismillah. With Bismillah he gained some attention with a performance on the BBC show Ebony in 1984. In 1993 Webbe joined the punk rock group Blood Brothers. At drummer Martyn Ford's insistence, Webbe started performing dancehall style vocals over the band's punk music, and the sound evolved into what became known as Dub War. With Dub War, he released two studio albums, Pain and Wrongside of Beautiful. A third album was in the works before the band split in 1999. Benji left Earache after they refused to let him record a solo album, which was intended to move to a more hip-hop sound. After a short lived project with Robert Trujillo, Mass Mental, which released one studio and one live album, Webbe formed Skindred with former members of Dub War. Due to a dispute with the record label, a new lineup moved to Bieler Bros. As of 2026, Skindred have released nine studio albums.

In 2006, Webbe performed with Korn at the 2006 Download Festival, while Korn's lead singer Jonathan Davis was seriously ill, he sang "A.D.I.D.A.S." He has also appeared on Bullet for My Valentine's 2008 album Scream Aim Fire (on "Take It Out on Me"), as well as Soulfly's debut album (on "Quilombo" and "Prejudice").

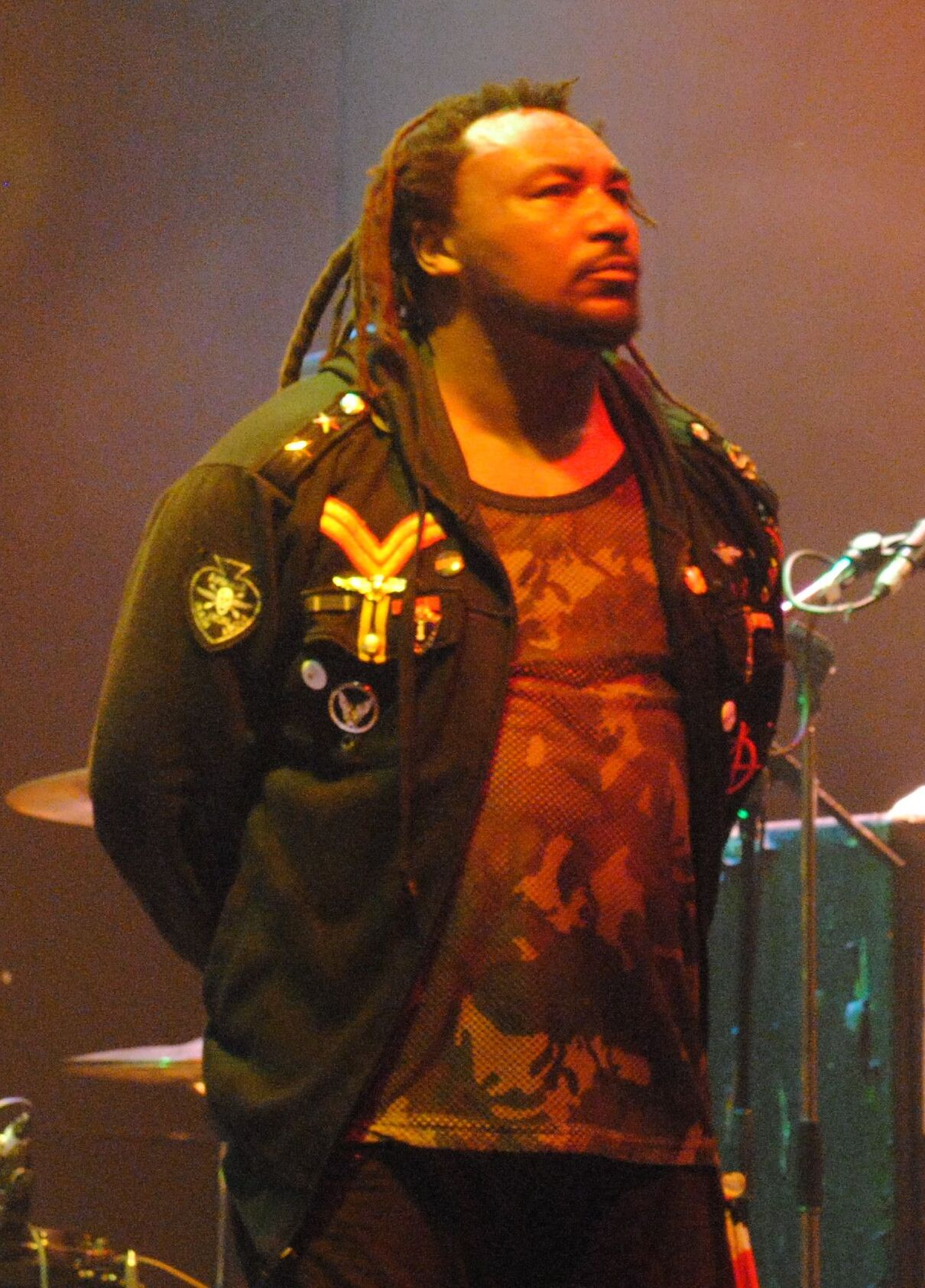
Webbe in 2010

In 2012, Webbe collaborated with the rap metal band Dirty Wormz on their album Outbreak, appearing on the song "Blood & Fire".

In 2015, Webbe released his debut solo album, a purely reggae album entitled I Haven't Been Nicking in Ages, produced by Monsta Boy. He has also been performing intermittently with the reformed Mass Mental and in 2015, Dub War.

In 2018, commemorating Black History Month in the United Kingdom, Webbe was included on a list of 100 "Brilliant, Black and Welsh" people.

In 2020, Webbe unveiled a new studio project with Dub War bassist Richie Glover, entitled Diamond Spider. The "voodoo blues" project released its debut single in October that year, with a self-titled album due in 2021 along with Dub War's fourth studio album.

== Personal life ==
Webbe has four children with his ex-wife and 19 grandchildren. In September 2022, he married his wife Julie Christian in a private wedding ceremony.

== Discography ==
=== Solo discography ===
Year	Title
2015	I Haven't Been Nicking in Ages

=== Skindred discography ===
Year	Title
2002	Babylon
2007	Roots Rock Riot
2009	Shark Bites and Dog Fights
2011	Union Black
2014	Kill the Power
2015	Volume
2018	Big Tings
2023	Smile
2026	You Got This

=== Dub War discography ===
Year	Title
1993	Words of Dubwarning
1995	Pain
1996	Wrong Side of Beautiful
1998	Step Ta Dis
2009	Demos 2010
2010	The Dub, the War and the Ugly
2021	Declaration of Dub War
2022	Westgate Under Fire

=== Diamond Spider discography ===
Year	Title
2021	Diamond Spider

=== Mass Mental? discography ===
Year	Title
1999	How to Write Love Songs
1999	Live in Tokyo

=== Collaborations ===
Year	Band	Album	Song(s)
1998	Soulfly	Soulfly	"Quilombo"; "Prejudice"
2003	Bong Ra	Bikini Bandits, Kill! Kill! Kill!	"Blood & Fire"
2004	Jeff Killed John	Jeff Killed John (EP)	"Nation2Nation"
2008	Bullet for My Valentine	Scream Aim Fire	"Take It Out on Me"
2010	Forever Never	I Can't Believe It's Not Metal	"Boombastic"
2012	diRTy WoRMz	Outbreak	"Blood & Fire"
2015	Farmikos	Farmikos	"Fragile"
2015	Silly Band!	Water Is the Ruination of Everything	"Save My Farm"
2015	Crossfaith	Xeno	"Wildfire"
2015	Modestep	London Road	"Circles"
2016	Dubioza Kolektiv	Happy Machine	"Riot Fire"
2017	Sumo Cyco	Opus Mar	"Move Mountains"
2017	As Sirens Fall		"In My Mind"
2018	Florence Black	The Final EP	"Gunshot"
2019	Phil Campbell	Old Lions Still Roar	"Dead Roses"
2021	Dirty Shirt		"Pretty Faces"
2022	Punk Rock Factory	A Whole New Wurst 2	"Shiny"
2022	The Alarm	Omega	"Safe from Harm"
2022	Undead Corporation Doujin Works	J.O.I.N.T	"Get It"
2022	Massive Wagons	Triggered!	"Generation Prime"
2023	Russkaja	Turbo Polka Party	"Vozdukh"
2024	BLACKGOLD	Cypress Hill Mixtape	"Insane in the Brain"
