= Undead Corporation =

Japanese extreme metal and dōjin band

- Origin: Tokyo, Japan
- Genres: Extreme metal; Death metal; Brutal death metal; Folk metal; Melodic death metal; Metalcore; Deathcore; Doujin music
- Years active: 2010–present
- Members: Akemi; Kubota Dōgen; Matsuyama "Shacho" Kensuke; En; Yo Onityan; Micu; Minami Ayumu; MAKI
- Past members: Hirano "Shiren" Yukimura; Morishita Fumiya; Jinya; Yūto "YU-TO" Sugano

Undead Corporation is a Japanese extreme metal and doujin band formed in Tokyo in 2010. They combine different styles and elements of extreme metal.

== History ==
The group was formed in 2010 by the musical duo Kensuke "Shacho" Matsuyama and Hirano "Shiren" Yukimura of Unlucky Morpheus. Yukimura was replaced by vocalists Kubota Dōgen and Akemi two years after forming the group.

Between 2010 and 2016, the band released 14 albums and two EPs, which were influenced by the Touhou and KanColle franchises which resulted in the band gaining high popularity within the gamer and otaku communities. The albums Flash Back, No Antidote and J.O.I.N.T. managed to rank in the Oricon Albums Chart. The 2022 released album J.O.I.N.T. features guest vocals by Tom Barber of Chelsea Grin and Benji Webbe of Skindred.

On October 9, 2015 the band played their first international show in Hannover, Germany.

In March 2019, Kensuke Matsuyama formed another death metal band called Devil Within featuring YU-TO on drums. The side project released their debut album Dark Supremacy the same year.

== Discography ==
=== Major studio albums ===
Title	Album details
O.D.	Released: 2012-12-30; Label: None (ANCO-0008); Formats: CD, digital download
Flash Back	Released: 2015-07-01; Label: None (ANCO-0014); Formats: CD, digital download
NO ANTIDOTE	Released: 2017-10-04; Label: None (ANCO-0019); Formats: CD, digital download
J.O.I.N.T.	Released: 2022-06-09; Label: None (UNCO-001, UNCO-002); Formats: CD, digital download

=== Major live videos ===
Title	Album details
LIVE UNDEAD	Released: 2017-08-16; Label: None (ANCO-0018); Formats: DVD

=== Dōjin albums ===
Title	Release date	Catalog number
Gensōkyo Kara Chō-kōtetsu Jūtei Bakuon (幻想郷から超鋼鉄重低爆音)	2010-08-14	ANCO-0001
Mangetsu no Yoru ni Chō-senritsuteki Jūtei Bakuon (満月の夜に超旋律的重低爆音)	2010-10-31	ANCO-0002
Gokutetsu (極鉄)	2010-12-30	ANCO-0003
Oni Togizōshi (鬼伽草子)	2011-03-13	ANCO-0004
Rare Tracks (レアトラックス)	2011-05-01	ANCO-0004.5
Watashi wa Mō Shindeiru? (私はもう死んでいる？)	2011-08-13	ANCO-0005
Ichigeki (一撃)	2011-12-30	ANCO-0006
Benizome no Oni ga Naku (紅染の鬼が哭く)	2012-08-11	ANCO-0007
Parallelism・γ	2012-12-30	UNUN-0001
Bōkun (暴君)	2013-08-12	ANCO-0009
Shinsoku (神速)	2014-08-16	ANCO-0010
Tsuwamono (兵-つはもの-)	2014-12-29	ANCO-0011
Umi no Kaze Riku no Hana (海の風 陸の花)	2014-12-29	ANCO-0012
Shunsatsu (瞬殺)	2015-05-10	ANCO-0013
Mettagiri (滅多斬)	2015-08-14	ANCO-0015
Otoko (漢)	2015-12-30	ANCO-0016
Tamashii (魂)	2016-05-08	ANCO-0017
Kabukimono (傾奇者)	2017-12-29	ANCO-0020
Gō (剛)	2018-05-06	ANCO-0021

=== Dōjin compilations ===
Title	Release date	Catalog number
TOHO COMPLETE BOX	2013-12-30	COM-1
TOHO COMPLETE BOX 2	2016-12-29	COM-2
