= Savage Skies =

2002 video game

- European cover art
- Developer: iRock Interactive
- Publishers: NA: BAM! Entertainment; JP: Success; EU: Bigben Interactive
- Director: Robert Stevenson
- Producer: Mike Pearson
- Designers: Randy Greenback; Rick Raymer; Robert Stevenson; Brian Tate
- Programmers: Paul L. Rowan; Brian Stone
- Composer: Jack Blades
- Platform: PlayStation 2
- Release: NA: 28 March 2002; JP: 6 March 2003; EU: 12 March 2004
- Genre: Combat flight simulator
- Modes: Single-player, multiplayer

Savage Skies is a 2002 combat flight simulator video game developed by iRock Interactive and published by BAM! Entertainment in North America, Success in Japan and Bigben Interactive in Europe. The game is set in a fictional dark fantasy world and is accompanied by a heavy metal inspired soundtrack.

The game was originally conceived as a licensed tie-in game endorsed by heavy metal musician Ozzy Osbourne, but licensing difficulties and the impact of the September 11 attacks on the entertainment industry forced iRock to retool the game and release it without the Osbourne branding.

== Gameplay ==
Player defends the Capitol in Virtwyn campaign

The player can choose between three warring factions of various flying creatures – Virtwyn, Chrysalis and Pariah, playing as one of three pilots. The three kingdoms were created when the King of Fraewyn fell to the necromancer Mortalvis, and the magical land was divided. The first two parts were owned by subjects and closest advisors of the late king, whilst Mortalvis took the last third. The King, believed to be dead, reincarnated in three champions of each faction.

The world of the game populated with mounts that ranges from rotting and hellish monsters along with created with chemistry mutants to mythical beings, such as classical griffon and dragons.

Most creatures can perform flying maneuvers, such as commonly known Barrel Roll and Super Loop. Other Special Moves including Super Flap that gains height; using Power Dive repeatedly while flying will build up incredibly amounts of speed. Mount also can be put into Hover mode, as without controlling the creature automatically flies forward.

Once mission is completed, played mounts can be used in any campaign's unlocked missions and also in two-player levels. Collectable Crystal Shard can be picked up on the levels, which would upgrade Crystal Power and Crystal Seekers, such as unlocking additional cheats in Gameplay Options, that works only in passed missions, and load screen and concept art videos in Theater. By completing a secret objective on one specific level of each campaign, the portal can be opened for player to enter the secret mission, which by passing would unlock in total three secret creatures of the game.

The game contains brief sequences between missions and splash, backstory and endings as pre-rendered movies.

== Development ==
Savage Skies was initially developed and set for release as Ozzy's Black Skies, complete with an endorsement from Black Sabbath front man Ozzy Osbourne. The game was going to feature Ozzy's imagery and tracks as well as voice acting, and was planned to be released on the PlayStation 2, Xbox and Windows built on the multi-platform RFEngine, based on the open-source OpenSpace 3D and named after the cancelled game "Red Fury" from the developer Interactive Magic in 1999.

The game—which eventually became iRock's sole product—was announced on 25 July 2000, which eventually was reused for final version. PC and PS2 versions of Ozzy's Black Skies was presented at E3 2001, at the iRock booth. At Ozzfest in summer 2001, audience were treated to a preview of the game before performance of festival headliners Black Sabbath. In the 17 July 2001 iRock developers got backstage pass at Ozzfest in Charlotte, Verizon Wireless Amphitheatre. People had a chance to play in demo game and buy Tour Program book at Ozzfest's tent "Village of the Damned" with Ozzy's Black Skies promo poster on back cover.

By the original concept, each of three playable factions based on Ozzy's three real life and music career periods divided by decades. The 1970s represents Ozzy's youth and music formed by horror films in the Pariah realm, consisting of summoned monsters and undead people which were slain under Mortalvis' revenge, who was banished from the Fraewyn empire with other outcasts and criminal elements. The 1980s refers to Ozzy's "madman" public image and werewolf likeness on "Bark at the Moon" album cover which embodied in the Chrysalis collective, a scientific kingdom that using alchemy for mutating creatures and warriors. And in the 1990s Ozzy reinvented himself as a family man figure that was inserted in Virtwyn kingdom, founded on principles of strength and nobility that tamed beasts from natural world.

Original backstory narrates that the King of Fraewyn was swallowed by a giant bat, which refers to Ozzy's real incident when he bit the head off a bat in 1982 during live performance, instead of death by a demonic wraith in Savage Skies. Then his soul burst into three fragments and each reincarnated into three champions of separated factions as in retooled version. This enables the player to choose between Ozzy's alter-egos which being riders who trained to flight and control mounts in dogfights.

Sound design was driven by music from Black Sabbath and Osbourne which worked as a dynamic soundtrack. There were recorded new versions of "War Pigs", "Paranoid" and "Crazy Train", used released "No More Tears" and "See You On The Other Side" songs, and a track recorded specifically for iRock called "Black Skies". Several missions were loosely based on their songs, such as "Steal Away (The Night)", which pits player against a Virtwyn horde in an attempt to steal a Soul Crystal, which however still presents in Savage Skies as first mission titled "Soul Assassin" in Pariah campaign.

However, in late 2001, the tie-in was dropped for reasons including its high financial cost and "misconceptions about the game that made it difficult to secure a publisher" as well as the impact of the September 11, 2001 attacks as the developers felt that a combat flight simulator would be in poor taste in the aftermath of the attacks. Its name was subsequently changed to Savage Skies; Osbourne would later include the song "Black Skies" as a bonus track in Japanese and European pressings of the single "Dreamer".

In 2002, president George W. Bush mentioned the title song "Black Skies", when he jokingly listed the Ozzy's "big hit recordings" and said that "Mom loves your stuff", on White House Correspondents' Association dinner, where Osbourne and his wife and manager Sharon were invited by Fox News Channel correspondent Greta Van Susteren.

An Xbox version continued development as Savage Skies with updated graphics and supposed to be released by BigBen Interactive, but this version was cancelled. Despite this, the game was rated by the German rating system USK. This means the game was in a state, where the player could finish the whole game. A PC version was planned when the game still had the Ozzy branding.

== Critical reception ==
Savage Skies received "mixed or average" reviews according to review aggregator Metacritic.

Gamezone rated Savage Skies at 6.5 out of 10, finding the game concept to be fun with good variation in play style between the three factions. Criticisms included the average graphics, bad sound, and several missions with excessive difficulty.
