= Down to Earth (Ozzy Osbourne album) =

Studio album by Ozzy Osbourne
- Released: 16 October 2001
- Recorded: April 2000 – August 2001
- Studios: Henson, Hollywood
- Genre: Heavy metal
- Length: 48:34
- Label: Epic
- Producer: Tim Palmer

Ozzy Osbourne chronology
The Ozzman Cometh (1997)	Down to Earth (2001)	The Osbourne Family Album (2002)

Singles from Down to Earth
- 1. "Gets Me Through" Released: 4 September 2001; 2. "Dreamer" Released: January 2002

Professional ratings
Review scores
Source	Rating
AllMusic	4/5 stars
Entertainment Weekly	B+
Drowned in Sound	9/10
Rock Sound	3/5 stars
Q	3/5 stars
Rolling Stone	3.5/5 stars
Spin	6/10

Down to Earth is the eighth studio album by the English heavy metal singer Ozzy Osbourne. Released on 16 October 2001, it reached number 19 on the UK Albums Chart and number four on the US Billboard 200. "The Ozzfest was doing well", Osbourne explained. "I just wanted to be like the Grateful Dead and keep it going by touring, but the record company said they'd like a new Ozzy album."

Down to Earth spawned just two singles, although both reached the top ten of the US Hot Mainstream Rock Tracks chart and the top 40 of the Canadian Singles Chart, and reached number 18 on the UK Singles Chart.

Excluding his contributions to re-recordings of Ozzy's earlier material, Down to Earth is the only Osbourne studio album to feature bassist Robert Trujillo, who left to join Metallica in 2003, until Patient Number 9 in 2022. It was the first Osbourne album to feature drummer Mike Bordin, previously of Faith No More, though he had played live with Osbourne since 1996, as well as the last to feature guitarist Zakk Wylde until 2007's Black Rain. Though he plays on the album, Wylde did not contribute as a songwriter for the first time since joining Osbourne's band in 1988, because many of the songs were written before Wylde rejoined the band. Osbourne's previous guitarist Joe Holmes was involved in the writing and Osbourne chose to use outside songwriters such as producer Tim Palmer and Aerosmith collaborator Marti Frederiksen.

"Working with Tim on this album reminded me of [late guitarist] Randy [Rhoads]", Ozzy remarked of Palmer. "If it hadn't been for him, there wouldn't have been an album ... He has incredible patience, just like Randy."

Allegedly, the Weezer song "Hash Pipe" was slated for this album. Ozzy approached Weezer vocalist Rivers Cuomo for song ideas, and "Hash Pipe" was one of them, however, Osbourne did not use the song, and Weezer included it on their Green Album instead.

== Track listing ==
Standard edition
No.	Title	Writer(s)	Length
1.	"Gets Me Through"	Ozzy Osbourne; Tim Palmer	5:04
2.	"Facing Hell"	Osbourne; Palmer; Scott Humphrey; Geoff Nicholls	4:25
3.	"Dreamer"	Osbourne; Marti Frederiksen; Mick Jones	4:45
4.	"No Easy Way Out"	Osbourne; Palmer	5:06
5.	"That I Never Had"	Osbourne; Frederiksen; Joe Holmes; Robert Trujillo	4:23
6.	"You Know...(Part 1)"	Osbourne; Palmer	1:06
7.	"Junkie"	Osbourne; Frederiksen; Holmes; Trujillo	4:28
8.	"Running Out of Time"	Osbourne; Frederiksen; Jones	5:05
9.	"Black Illusion"	Osbourne; Palmer; Nicholls; Andy Sturmer	4:21
10.	"Alive"	Osbourne; Danny Saber	4:54
11.	"Can You Hear Them?"	Osbourne; Frederiksen; Holmes; Trujillo	4:58
Total length:			48:34

Japanese edition bonus track
No.	Title	Writer(s)	Length
12.	"No Place for Angels"	Osbourne; Palmer; Nicholls	3:23
Total length:			51:57

20th anniversary expanded edition bonus tracks
No.	Title	Writer(s)	Length
12.	"No Place for Angels"	Osbourne; Palmer; Nicholls	3:23
13.	"Dreamer" (Acoustic Version)	Osbourne; Frederiksen; Jones	4:33
14.	"Gets Me Through" (Single Version)	Osbourne; Palmer	4:08

== Personnel ==
Primary musicians

- Ozzy Osbourne – vocals
- Zakk Wylde – guitars
- Robert Trujillo – bass
- Mike Bordin – drums

Additional musicians

- Tim Palmer – rhythm guitar, acoustic guitar, keyboards, military drums, backing vocals, production, mixing
- Michael Railo – keyboards, string arrangements, backing vocals
- Danny Saber – additional guitars on "Alive"

Production and artwork personnel

- Mark Dearnley – engineering, mixing
- Jamie Sickora – engineering assistance
- Alex Uychocde – mixing assistance
- John Porter – Pro Tools engineering
- Stephen Marcussen – mastering
- Stewart Whitmore – digital editing
- David Coleman – art direction
- Nitin Vadukul – photography

== Charts ==
=== Weekly charts ===
Weekly chart performance for Down to Earth
Chart (2001–2002)	Peak position
Australian Albums (ARIA)	46
Canadian Albums (Billboard)	2
Danish Albums (Hitlisten)	30
European Albums Chart	20
Finnish Albums (Suomen virallinen lista)	9
French Albums (SNEP)	104
German Albums (Offizielle Top 100)	15
Hungarian Albums (MAHASZ)	37
Italian Albums (FIMI)	22
Japanese Albums (Oricon)	8
New Zealand Albums (RMNZ)	41
Norwegian Albums (VG-lista)	12
Polish Album (OLiS)	32
Scottish Albums (Official Charts)	20
Swedish Albums (Sverigetopplistan)	1
Swiss Albums (Schweizer Hitparade)	47
UK Albums (Official Charts)	19
UK Rock & Metal Albums (Official Charts)	2
US Billboard 200	4

=== Year-end charts ===
2001 year-end chart performance for Down to Earth
Chart (2001)	Peak position
Canadian Albums (Nielsen SoundScan)	123

2002 year-end chart performance for Down to Earth
Chart (2002)	Position
Canadian Metal Albums (Nielsen SoundScan)	33
US Billboard 200	149

== Certifications ==
Certifications for Down to Earth by Ozzy Osbourne
Region	Certification	Certified units/sales
Canada (Music Canada)	Platinum	100,000^{^}
Denmark (IFPI Danmark)	Gold	10,000^{‡}
United Kingdom (BPI)	Silver	60,000^{^}
United States (RIAA)	Platinum	1,000,000^{^}
^{^} Shipments figures based on certification alone.^{‡} Sales+streaming figures based on certification alone.
