= Dub War =

Welsh metal band

- Origin: Newport, Wales
- Genres: Alternative metal; reggae; rap metal; ragga jungle
- Years active: 1993–1999; 2014–present
- Labels: Saint Ringland; Words of Warning; Earache
- Spinoffs: Skindred
- Members: Benji Webbe (vocals); Jeff Rose (guitar); Richie Glover (bass); Mikee Gregory (drums)
- Past members: Martin 'Ginge' Ford (drums)
- Website: www.dubwar.co.uk

Dub War are a four-piece metal band from Newport, Wales. Formed in 1993, the band's musical style is a mix of metal, punk, and reggae.

== Biography ==
Dub War formed in 1993 in Wales. The band released two albums, via the metal label Earache Records; Pain, released in 1995 and Wrong Side of Beautiful in 1996. Dub War split in 1999 after disputes with their label. After a short stint with the supergroup Mass Mental, lead singer Benji Webbe went on to form Skindred with Jeff Rose and Martyn Ford.

In 2010, Digby Pearson of Earache Records approached Webbe with the idea of releasing a DVD of the then last Dub War show and previous video. The DVD was released as a box set including a CD of rare recordings.

The band performed a low-key show in Newport in 2014 in a one-off reunion, using Mikee Gregory on drums, replacing Martin 'Ginge' Ford. However, in May 2015, after Ghost Town withdrew their spot, Dub War were announced for a special half-hour set on the 4th Stage at Download Festival. This was followed by the announcement that they would appear at the 2015 Velvet Coalmine Festival in south Wales, along with acts like Meat Puppets and Nicky Wire.

In March 2016 the group released a new single, their first since 1997, called "Fun Done". The track premiered on TeamRock on 2 March 2016. The song is the first of a planned set of 12 singles to be released on a limited 500 copy vinyl every time the band performs one of their sporadic shows over the next 2–3 years, before being released together on CD and digitally.

On 2 March 2022 Dub War announced that they would be releasing the new album Westgate Under Fire - their first album of all new material in 26 years. Westgate Under Fire also marks a reunion with their original record label, Earache Records. It was released on 5 August 2022 on coloured vinyl, signed CD, cassette and digital download.

Their first single from Westgate Under Fire was also released on March 2 - “Blackkk Man”. Benji Webbe said of the song: “This song is exactly how I was feeling at the time of Mr George Floyd's murder. This is a cry from my heart for equal rights and justice – and the other boys in the band feel the same as I do. No one chooses the skin they're in - should the skin you're in help you to win? It’s a question we all need to think about! This racist injustice has been going on way too long and, unfortunately, even with all the cries and the pain, it still continues.”

'Westgate Under Fire' features multiple guest musicians, including Stone Sour’s Roy Mayorga, Faith No More’s Mike Bordin, Snot's Mikey Doling and Jamie Miller, In Flames' Tanner Wayne, Ill Niño’s Dave Chavarri, Killing Joke’s Spike T Smith, and ska musician Ranking Roger.

Westgate Under Fire is named after an event in the band's hometown's history, the Newport Rising: "An event which would play a role in transforming democracy in Britain and the world, the uprising in 1839 saw the Chartist movement [see Chartism] march through south Wales, seeking social reform, including the right for men of all classes to vote. The marches ended in a bloody battle at the Westgate Hotel, which saw many of the Chartists dead or wounded. ‘Westgate Under Fire’ aims to embody the empowerment that Chartists took upon themselves all those years ago and coincides with the local community resurrecting the derelict Westgate Hotel into an exciting new venue."

== Discography ==
=== Albums ===
Year	Title
1994	Dubwarning (EP)
1995	Pain
1996	Wrong Side of Beautiful
1998	Step Ta Dis
2005	Demos 1998
2010	The Dub, the War and the Ugly
2022	Westgate Under Fire

=== Singles ===
Year	Single	From the album	UK Singles Chart placing
1994	"Respected"	Dubwarning	-
1994	"Mental EP"	Pain	-
1995	"Gorrit"	Pain	85
1995	"Strike It"	Pain	70
1995	"Enemy Maker"	Wrong Side of Beautiful	41
1996	"Cry Dignity"	Wrong Side of Beautiful	59
1996	"Soundclash EP"	Remixes taken from Wrong Side of Beautiful	-
1997	"Million Dollar Love"	Wrong Side of Beautiful	73
1997	"Dreams & Illusions"	Standalone Single	-
2016	"Fun Done"	Westgate Under Fire	-
2016	"Making a Monster" renamed Mary Shelley	Westgate Under Fire	-
2022	"Blackkk Man"	Westgate Under Fire	-
2022	"War Inna Babylon"	Westgate Under Fire	-
2022	"Vibes In The Place"	Westgate Under Fire	-
2022	"Get Back Up"	Westgate Under Fire	-
2022	"Coffin Lid"	Westgate Under Fire	-
