= Robert Trujillo =

American bassist (born 1964)

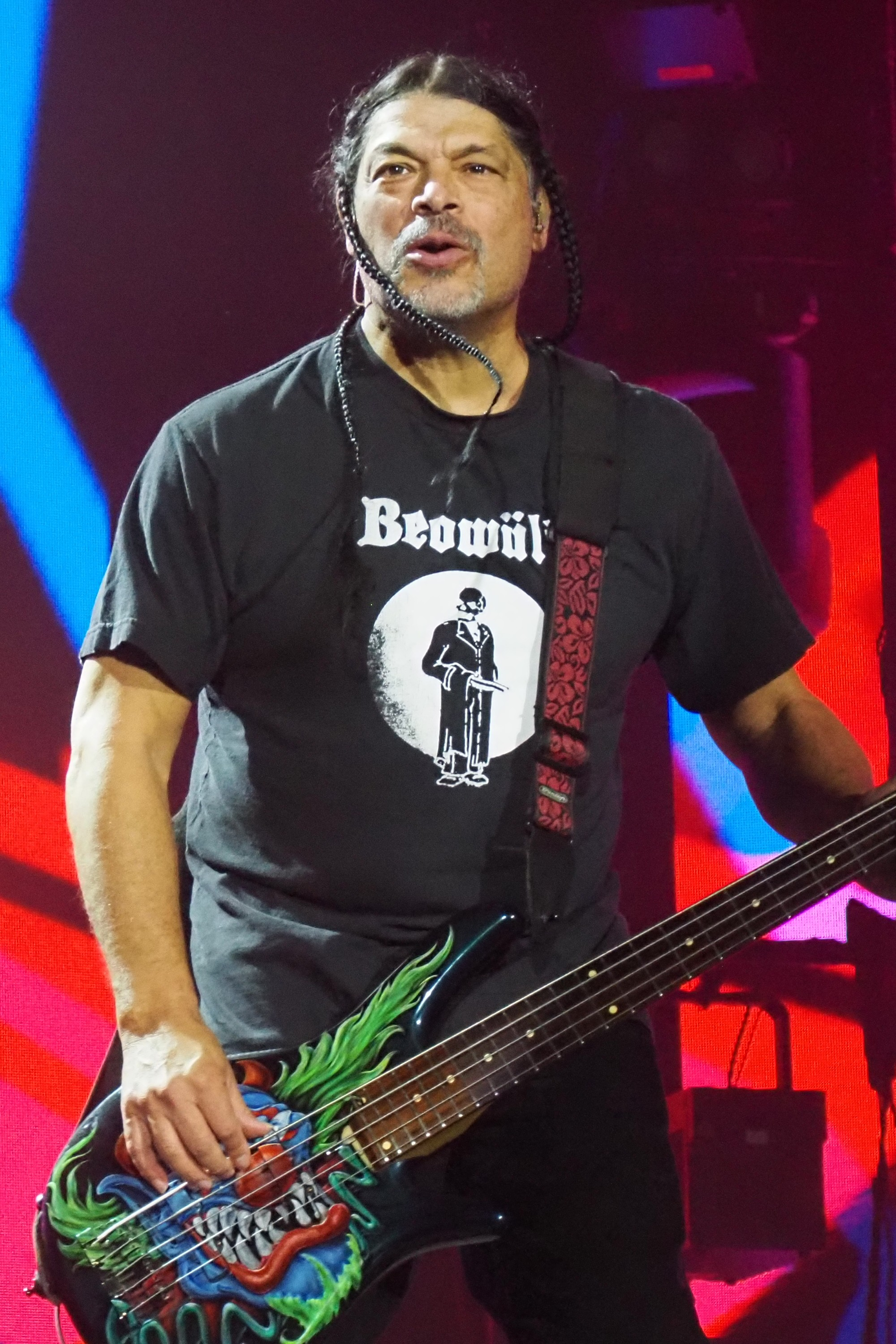
- Trujillo performing with Metallica in 2025

Background information
- Born: Roberto Agustín Miguel Santiago Samuel Trujillo Veracruz; October 23, 1964 (age 62); Santa Monica, California, U.S.
- Genres: Heavy metal; thrash metal; funk metal; crossover thrash
- Occupation: Musician
- Instrument: Bass guitar
- Years active: 1978–present
- Member of: Metallica; Infectious Grooves; Mass Mental
- Formerly of: Suicidal Tendencies; Ozzy Osbourne (backing band); Jerry Cantrell (backing band)
- Children: Tye Trujillo

Roberto Agustín Miguel Santiago Samuel Trujillo Veracruz' (/truːˈhiːjoʊ/; born October 23, 1964) is an American musician who is the bassist for heavy metal band Metallica. He first rose to prominence as the bassist of crossover thrash band Suicidal Tendencies from 1989 to 1995, while also collaborating with Suicidal Tendencies frontman Mike Muir for funk metal supergroup Infectious Grooves. After leaving Suicidal Tendencies, he performed with Ozzy Osbourne, Jerry Cantrell, and heavy metal band Black Label Society. Trujillo joined Metallica in 2003 and is the band's longest-serving bassist. He was inducted to the Rock and Roll Hall of Fame as a member of Metallica in 2009.

== Life and career ==
=== Early life ===
Roberto Agustín Miguel Santiago Samuel Trujillo Veracruz was born in Santa Monica, California, on October 23, 1964. He is of Mexican and Native American descent. He grew up in Culver City, California. Trujillo gained an interest in music during his childhood; his mother was a huge fan of soul music, particularly musicians like Marvin Gaye, James Brown, and Sly and the Family Stone. Trujillo stated that "Jaco [Pastorius] was my hero growing up", and that the jazz bassist changed his view of what the instrument could play: "Hearing him was like hearing Eddie Van Halen doing "Eruption" for the first time: You thought, 'What instrument is that?' I loved jazz fusion and branched out from there. But Jaco had an edge that far exceeded his jazz persona. He was funk, he was rock, he was soul. And his whole attitude was punk." He began playing in "a lot of backyard party bands", playing music by Black Sabbath, Ozzy Osbourne, Rush, and Led Zeppelin. He went to jazz school when he was 19 with the intention of becoming a studio musician, but he maintained his passion for rock and metal.

=== Career ===
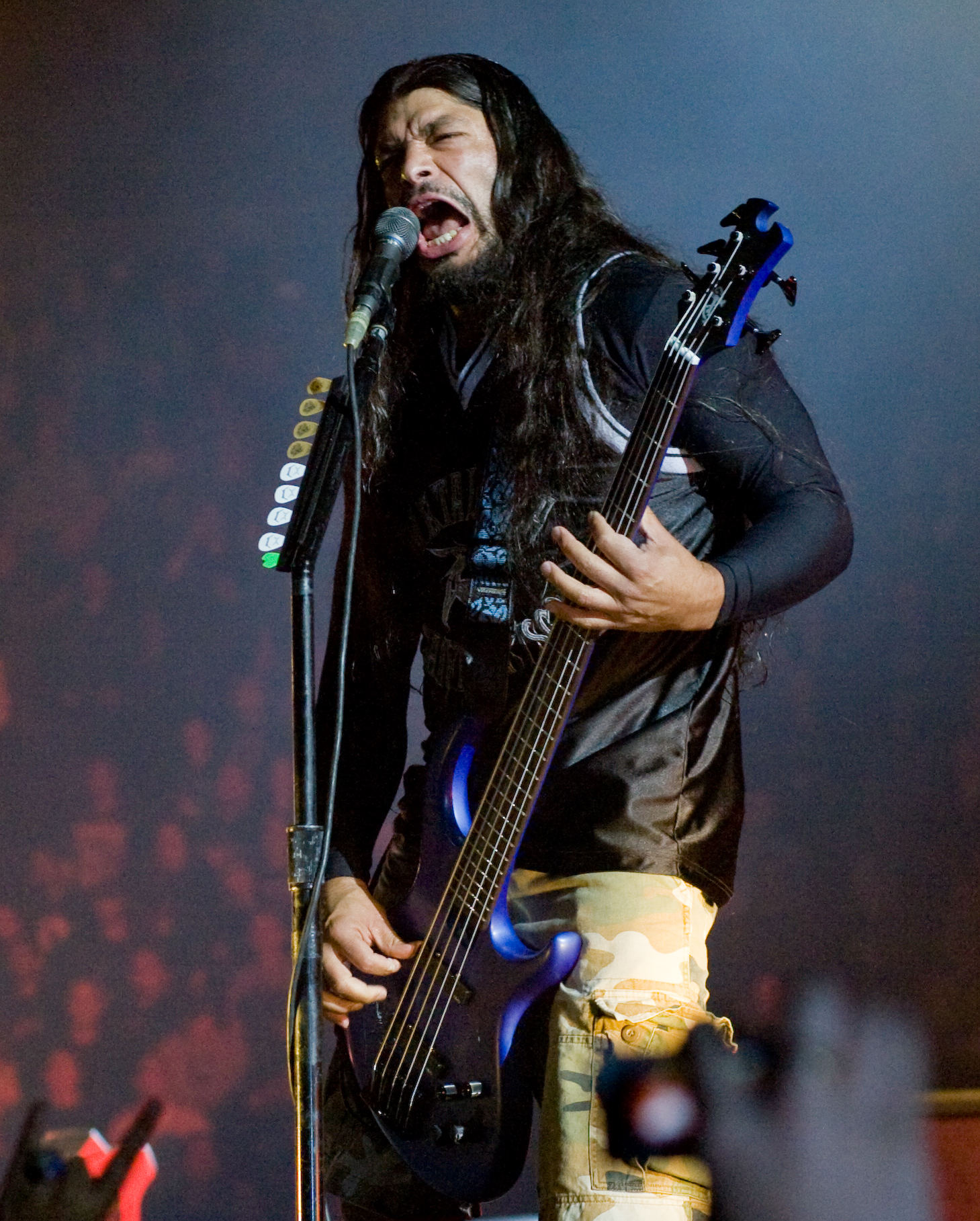
Trujillo performing in the O2 Arena in London, 2008

Trujillo gained prominence when he replaced Bob Heathcote as the bassist for California crossover thrash band Suicidal Tendencies. Initially billed as "Stymee" on the 1989 album Controlled by Hatred/Feel Like Shit...Déjà Vu, Trujillo remained in the band until the mid-1990s. Concurrent to his work with Suicidal Tendencies, Trujillo is a member of the band's side project, Infectious Grooves, along with vocalist Mike Muir.

Trujillo was a member of Ozzy Osbourne's band for a number of years starting in the late 1990s. In contrast to his earlier jazz and funk inspired playing, Osbourne's band was more straightforward hard rock and metal. Trujillo co-wrote several songs on the Down to Earth album. He was the subject of controversy for re-recording Bob Daisley's bass tracks for reissued versions of Osbourne's first two solo albums Blizzard of Ozz (1980) and Diary of a Madman (1981) after Daisley claimed that he was not paid proper royalties. During this time, Trujillo formed an experimental supergroup, Mass Mental, with then Dub War singer Benji Webbe, whose "ragga-punk-metal" outfit had just disbanded. The band released one studio album in Japan and one live album of their performance in Tokyo before disbanding. Zakk Wylde, a personal friend and bandmate from the Ozzy days, recruited him to play with Black Label Society for a few shows.

Trujillo joined Metallica on February 24, 2003, two years after Jason Newsted resigned. He had previously met and befriended his future bandmates when Suicidal Tendencies supported Metallica during the Nowhere Else to Roam tour in 1993, and again during the Shit Hits the Sheds Tour one year later. Trujillo received one million dollars from the band as an advance for joining Metallica. His audition and hiring as well as his million dollar payment offer appeared in the documentary film Metallica: Some Kind of Monster. As the current bassist for Metallica, he was inducted into the Rock and Roll Hall of Fame alongside all current members of the band, as well as previous bassists Jason Newsted and Cliff Burton.

=== Personal life ===
Trujillo is married and has a son and a daughter. Trujillo's wife, Chloé, has created a pyrography design of the Aztec calendar on one of his basses. His son, Tye, is the bassist of thrash metal band OTTTO and bassist for Trujillo's former band Suicidal Tendencies.

=== Other projects ===
In 2012, Trujillo produced a documentary about jazz bassist Jaco Pastorius titled Jaco, directed by Stephen Kijak and Paul Marchand. The film was named Official Film of Record Store Day 2014 and was released in November 2014.

== Technique ==
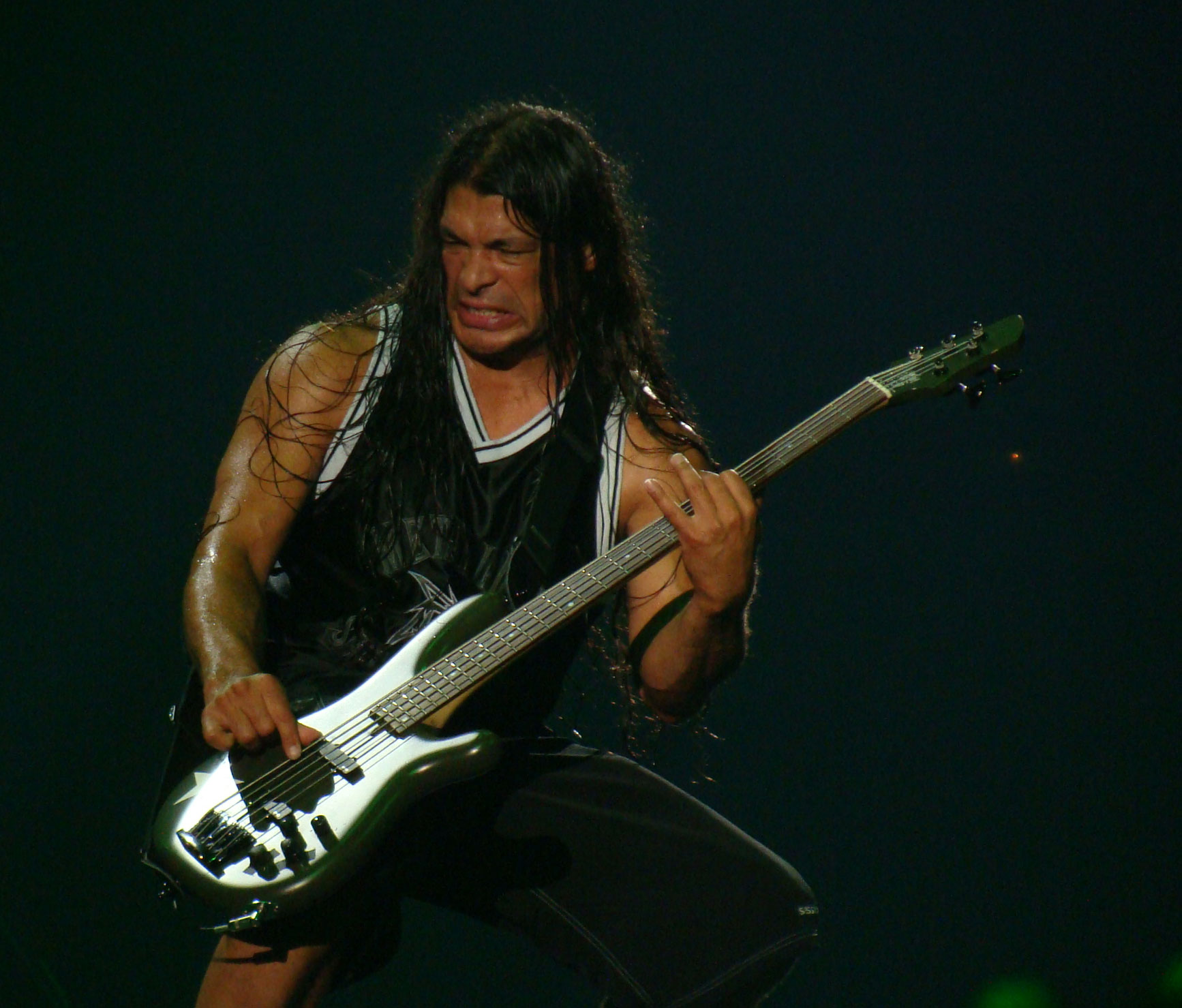
Trujillo in 2009

Trujillo is primarily a finger-style player, but sometimes plays with a pick. Trujillo's predecessor in Metallica, Jason Newsted, was predominantly a pick-style player; Cliff Burton, Newsted's predecessor and bassist on Metallica's first three albums, played finger-style exclusively. Trujillo is known for playing "massive chords" and "chord-based harmonics" on the bass.

Trujillo uses the slap bass technique, seen mostly in his work with Suicidal Tendencies and Infectious Grooves. At many of the shows during Metallica's 2004 Madly in Anger with the World Tour, Trujillo would often play an extended bass solo (dubbed "Jungle Essence" on recordings), which made extensive use of slap bass and other techniques and effects.

For recording purposes, Trujillo uses his own code for writing down bass arrangements. Inspired by an article by Pino Palladino, he developed this during the recording sessions for Jerry Cantrell's Degradation Trip, which, according to Trujillo, had him working from "little hoodrat demos" with nearly inaudible bass.

== Equipment ==
=== Bass guitars ===
With Metallica, Trujillo has primarily been playing Warwick Streamer bass guitars, both 5- and 4-strings. His signature model Streamer bass was released in March 2010. He often plays Fernandes Gravity 5-string basses, particularly a model with a silver finish, blue flame decals, and EMG pickups. In addition to his signature Warwick basses, Zon Guitars produce a signature bass model, the Sonus RT. Prior to Metallica, he was most often seen playing Tobias, ESP and MusicMan basses (all 5-strings), as well as a Fender Precision Bass with Black Label Society and Ozzy Osbourne. Trujillo has been seen in concert playing a Yamaha TRB5-P2 5-string bass, a customized green Rickenbacker 4001/4003 4-string bass modified with EMG pickups, various Nash P-Bass Copy guitars, and both a classic Fender Precision Bass and Fender Jazz Bass. Trujillo is the custodian of Jaco Pastorius' legendary "Bass Of Doom" (the sunburst fretless 1962 Jazz Bass used by Pastorius on most of his recordings and live appearances). He has performed onstage with Metallica with the instrument.

For amplification, he uses Ampeg amplifiers and cabinets. In 2010, Trujillo collaborated with Jim Dunlop to create his new Icon signature bass strings – these strings are taper-core stainless steel, with a non-tapered B string in gauges 45–130 (5-string).

=== Effects ===
Trujillo's pedal board consists of an Electro Harmonix Q-Tron, a Tech 21 SansAmp Bass Driver DI, a Tech 21 XXL, an MXR m-135 SmartGate, a Morley Mark Tremonti wah pedal, and a Boss OC-2 Octave Pedal; all powered by a Voodoo Lab Pedal Power.

== Discography ==
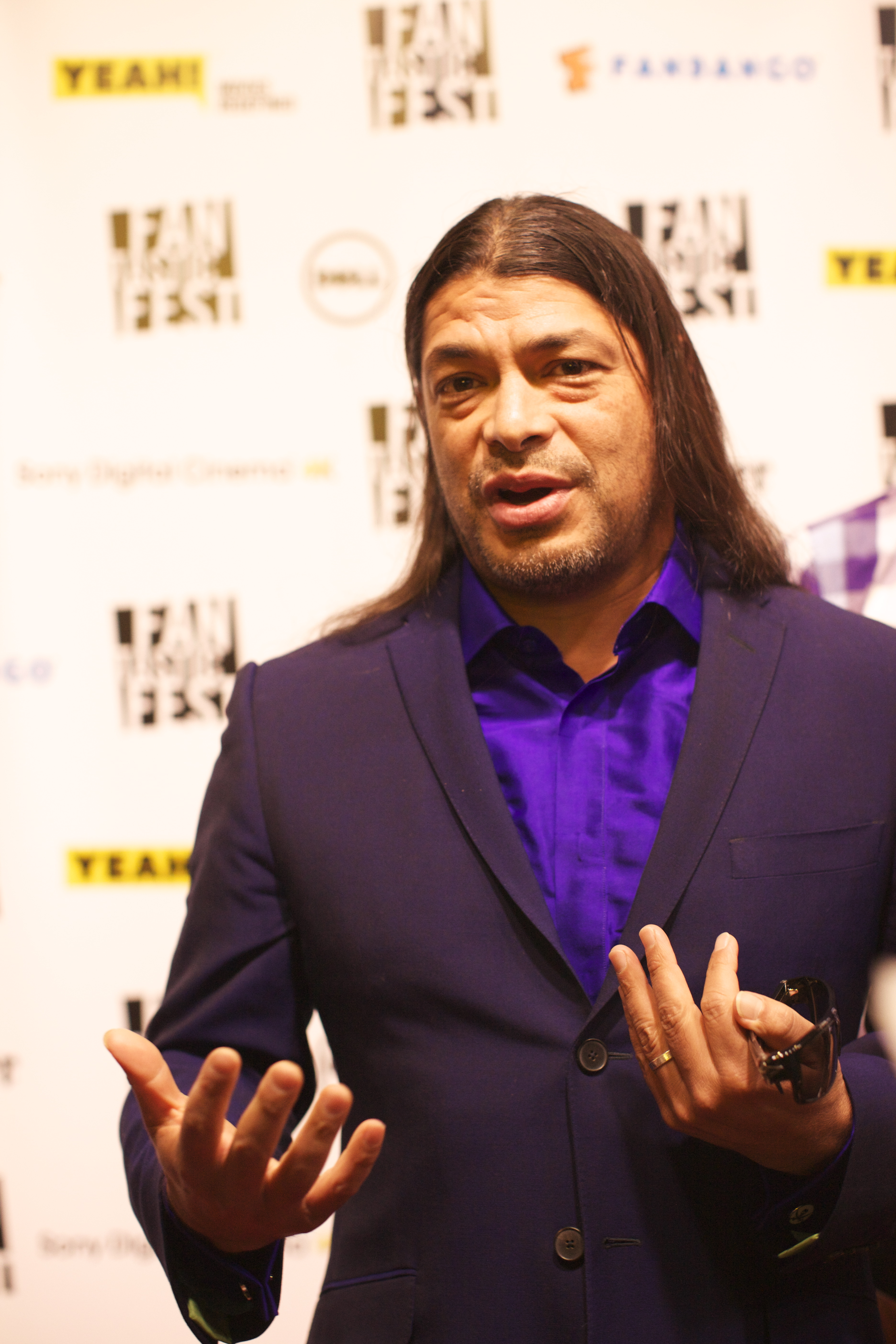
Trujillo in 2013

Jerry Cantrell

- Degradation Trip (2002)
- Degradation Trip Volumes 1 & 2 (2002)

Black Label Society

- 1919 Eternal (2002)

Infectious Grooves

- The Plague That Makes Your Booty Move... It's the Infectious Grooves (1991)
- Encino Man Soundtrack (1992)
- Sarsippius' Ark (1993)
- Groove Family Cyco (1994)
- Mas Borracho (1999)
- Year of the Cycos (2008)
- Funk It Up – Live in France 1995 (2010)
- Mad Mad Muir Musical Tour (2011)

Suicidal Tendencies

- Lights...Camera...Revolution! (1990)
- The Art of Rebellion (1992)
- Still Cyco After All These Years (1993)
- Suicidal for Life (1994)

Glenn Tipton

- Baptizm of Fire (1997)

Mass Mental?

- How to Write Love Songs (1999)
- Live in Tokyo (2001)

Ozzy Osbourne

- Down to Earth (2001)
- Blizzard of Ozz (reissue) (2002)
- Diary of a Madman (reissue) (2002)
- Live at Budokan (2002)
- Patient Number 9 (2022)

Metallica

- St. Anger (2003) (Credited as band member but does not play. Plays on bonus live DVD)
- Death Magnetic (2008)
- Lulu (with Lou Reed) (2011)
- Beyond Magnetic (EP) (2011)
- Hardwired... to Self-Destruct (2016)
- S&M2 (2020)
- 72 Seasons (2023)

Joe Holmes

- Joe Holmes (2026)

Various artists

- "The Blackest Box – The Ultimate Metallica Tribute" (2002)
- "A Song for Chi" (2009)
- A.N.I.M.A.L. – "Poder Latino" (guest in song track 6)
- Farmikos – "Farmikos" (2015)

== Videography ==
- Lights...Camera...Suicidal 1990 Suicidal Tendencies VHS home video
- Live at Budokan live album with accompanying live DVD
- Boozed, Broozed & Broken-Boned live DVD from Detroit, Michigan
- St. Anger live bonus DVD – 2003
- Metallica: Some Kind of Monster Metallica documentary
- The Videos 1989–2004 video compilation DVD
- Français Pour Une Nuit live DVD from the concert in Nîmes, France
- Orgullo, Pasión, y Gloria: Tres Noches en la Ciudad de México live DVD from the concerts in Mexico City
- The Big Four live DVD from Sofia, Bulgaria
- Metallica: Through the Never 2013 movie
- Jaco (2014) producer

== Video game appearances ==
- Trujillo appears in Guitar Hero: Metallica.
- He is a playable character in Tony Hawk's Pro Skater HD when the Pro Skater 3 HD Revert Pack downloadable content is installed.
- Trujillo appears with the rest of Metallica as playable characters in Fortnite.

Preceded by Bob Rock (Sessions)	Metallica bassist 2003–present	Succeeded by Current
