= Mike Bordin =

American drummer (born 1962)

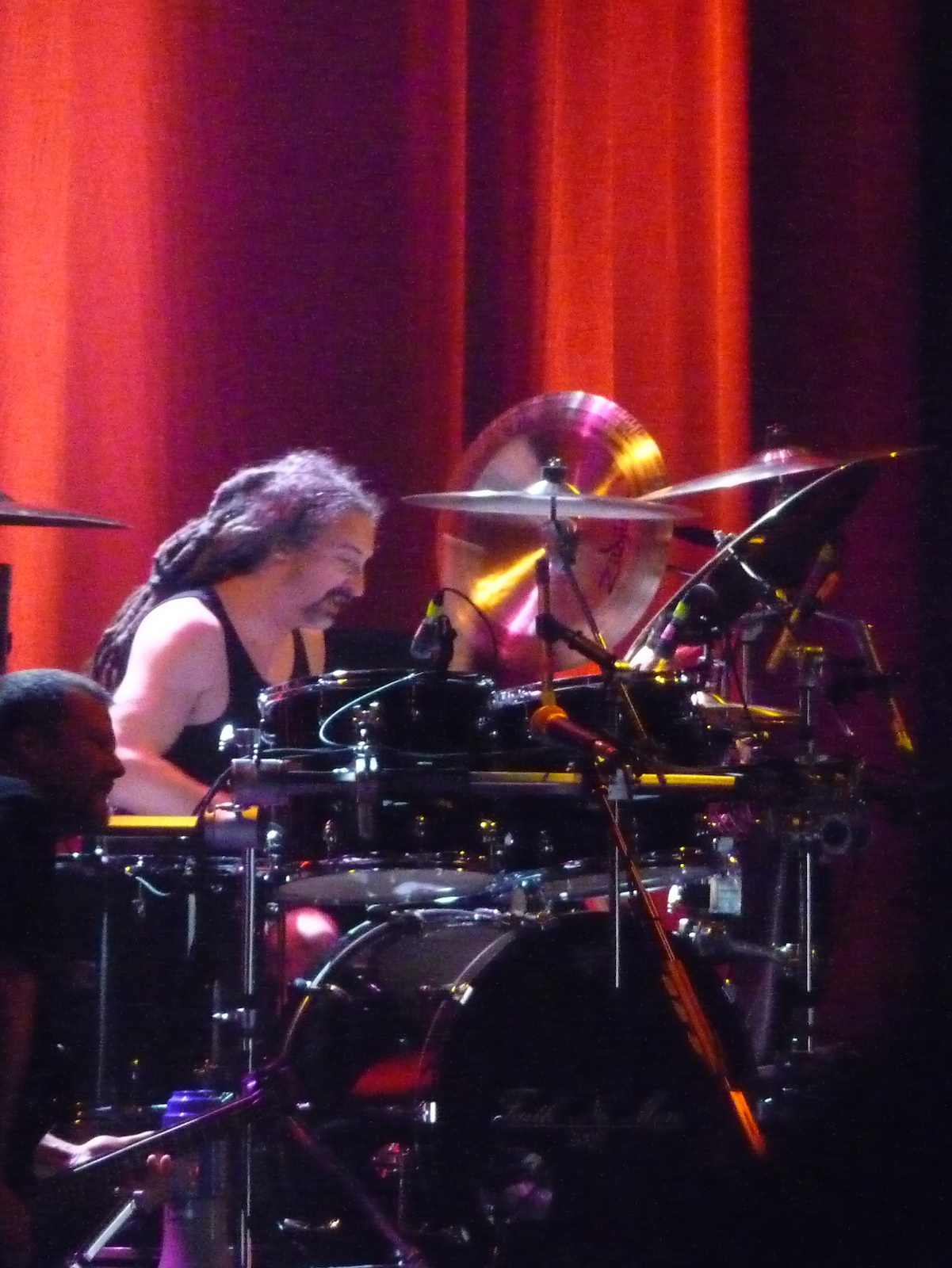
- Bordin performing with Faith No More in 2009

Background information
- Born: Michael Andrew Bordin; November 27, 1962 (age 63); San Francisco, California, U.S.
- Genres: Alternative metal; funk metal; alternative rock; heavy metal; hard rock; experimental rock
- Occupation: Musician
- Instrument: Drums
- Years active: 1979–present
- Member of: Faith No More
- Formerly of: Ozzy Osbourne, Jerry Cantrell

Michael Andrew Bordin (born November 27, 1962) is an American musician, best known as the drummer for the rock band Faith No More. He has amicably been known as "Puffy", "Puffster" or "The Puff", in reference to the afro hairstyle he wore in the early 1980s. The nicknames were coined by Faith No More guitarist Jim Martin, and they stuck around even after he grew out his hair and tied it in dreadlocks, a trademark look he has worn for most of his career.

Bordin was one of the three founding band members of Faith No More in 1983 and was the band's only drummer throughout its span, remaining with the group until its initial breakup in April 1998. He rejoined Faith No More when the band reformed in 2009. Bordin has also performed with Ozzy Osbourne, Black Sabbath, Korn, Black Label Society, Jerry Cantrell, Primus, The Chickenfuckers and Pop-O-Pies. Some of his pre-Faith No More bands include Faith. No Man., Sharp Young Men and EZ-Street. Bordin has played alongside all three Metallica bassists over the years; he played with Cliff Burton in EZ-Street and with Jason Newsted and Robert Trujillo with Ozzy Osbourne and Jerry Cantrell.

== Biography ==
=== Early years ===
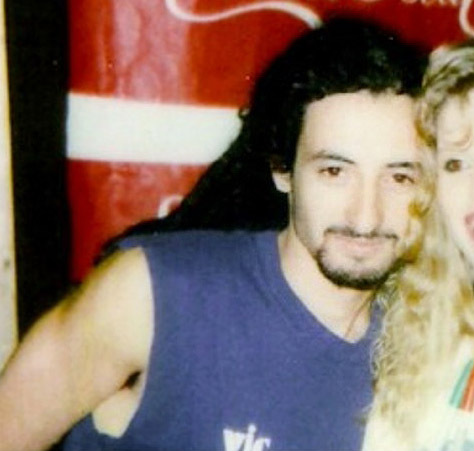
Bordin in 1990

Regarding his ancestral background, Bordin said in a 1990 interview with Australian publication Smash Hits "My grandfather came from Russia [and] Kyiv. That side of my family is Russian and Welsh. The other side is Italian, Hungarian and i think some Polish too. I'm a real mongrel.". Billy Gould also mentions Bordin's Jewish descent. In the late 1970s, while still a student at Castro Valley High School, Bordin formed his first band EZ-Street with future Metallica bassist Cliff Burton. The two recruited local metalhead and future Faith No More guitarist Jim Martin to complete the trio.

In 1981, Bordin left EZ-Street because of frictions with guitarist Jim Martin. He joined up with a San Francisco post-punk outfit going under the name of Sharp Young Men. Sharp Young Men was fronted by Mike Morris (also on guitar), with Billy Gould on bass and keyboardist Wade Worthington. After playing a few shows for a year, the band decided to change its name because it didn't like the image it gave off. In late 1982, Sharp Young Men became Faith. No Man., a name that Bordin suggested, meaning "Faith In No Man".

Faith. No Man. recorded a two-song 7" single in early 1983, followed by a three-song demo tape in the summer. In between those two recordings, keyboardist Wade Worthington left and was replaced by Billy Gould's childhood friend Roddy Bottum. In the late summer, Bordin, Bottum and Gould quit Faith. No Man. because of frictions with Morris, and formed a new band, Faith No More. Faith No More played its first show in October 1983. Bordin's former EZ-Street bandmate Jim Martin later joined the band in the summer of 1984.

=== Faith No More ===
Faith No More was founded in San Francisco in the 1980s. Faith No More released their first album, We Care a Lot, in 1985. After releasing several more albums, including the Grammy-nominated The Real Thing, Faith No More disbanded in 1998. In 2009, Faith No More reformed and performed a series of festival shows in Europe and Australia, leading to several shows in select American cities. In 2015, Faith No More released Sol Invictus, their first album since Album of the Year, and first since their reunion. It met considerable critical attention, and the band embarked on a worldwide tour.

=== Collaborations with Primus ===
Bordin has worked closely with Primus on several occasions. He first provided guest vocals on two songs from Primus' 1990 album Frizzle Fry; "John the Fisherman" and "Sathington Willoby", credited under the Fart Sandwich Posse band. In 1991 he provided guest vocals and drums on the song "Los Bastardos" which was released on Sailing the Seas of Cheese. Finally, he played drums on the song "Choked", a collaboration with Primus' Tim Alexander and Tool's Maynard James Keenan, released on the 1997 compilation Flyin' Traps.

=== Ozzy Osbourne ===
In 1996, Bordin began performing with Ozzy Osbourne's band. Due to Black Sabbath drummer Bill Ward's health issues during tour, Bordin had a brief stretch playing with the other original members of Black Sabbath. He played the closing segments of Osbourne's 1997 headlining concerts during the Ozzfest tour. Bordin re-recorded the drum tracks on Osbourne's solo albums, Blizzard of Ozz and Diary of a Madman, for the controversial remasters released in 2002. The re-recordings were the result of a lawsuit brought by original drummer Lee Kerslake and original bassist Bob Daisley for unpaid royalties.

=== Korn ===
In 2000, Bordin filled in as Korn's live drummer for approximately 7 months and nearly 100 shows. At the time of his joining, Korn's fourth album Issues had been nominated for two Grammys in March 2000 and had already achieved triple-platinum certification by the RIAA since its release five months earlier, in November 1999. Korn's Sick and Twisted Tour began on February 18, 2000, to promote the full-length. On March 10, 2000, only 14 dates into the tour, Korn drummer David Silveria's right wrist gave out on the night of their concert at the Fargodome in Fargo, North Dakota. The band went out on stage and Silveria announced to the audience that the concert had to be postponed because of his inability to play. The injury was allegedly caused by Silvera's left ribs, and the same limp wrist condition had previously occurred the year before, causing the band to cancel the last two shows of their tour with Rob Zombie. Three Midwest dates in Madison, Wisconsin, Minneapolis, Minnesota and Moline, Illinois had to be rescheduled while the band found a replacement.

Korn returned to California for a few days and called on Bordin to fill in while Silveria recovered. The band invited Bordin because he was apparently the only drummer they could think of who could perform in the style they wanted. Faith No More had been a major inspiration when Korn started out in the early 1990s, and the band later went on to record a cover of We Care a Lot in 2005 for a proposed covers' album titled Korn Kovers. Korn spent 5 days (March 11–15) teaching Bordin an initial 12 songs at their rehearsal space in California, with Silveria present to guide him. Throughout the rest of the year, Bordin learned an additional 10 songs, which were added to the set list. On March 16, the band flew out to Illinois for their first show with Bordin on drums at the Allstate Arena in Rosemont. Bordin remained with Korn for the rest of the year, which also included The Summer Sanitarium Tour with Metallica in June and July. He also traveled with Korn to Europe to promote Issues. Silveria returned to Korn in the fall of 2000 to start writing their fifth album, later released as Untouchables.

=== Other appearances ===
On January 21, 2001, Bordin competed on the television game show Who Wants to Be a Millionaire. He missed the $32,000 question, winning $1,000. His appearance on the show was not on the celebrity edition, but a normal edition with the jackpot raised at $1,810,000. Coincidentally, his wife Merilee had been the contestant right before him. She also reached the $32,000 question and missed. Former Ozzy Osbourne bandmate Robert Trujillo (now of Metallica) attended in the audience.

=== Personal life ===
Mike Bordin was married in 1994 to Merilee Ann Bordin (née Hague) after dating for 10 years (since 1984). She is a classically trained chef and food stylist who studied at the University of California, Berkeley. Mike and Merilee have two daughters, Abby and Violet. Bordin's eldest daughter was born in 1997 when he was touring for Faith No More's Album of the Year, and Violet is an artist who designed poster art for the band.

== Equipment (2009) ==
As a left-handed drummer, he uses a right-handed kit with his ride cymbal on the left.

Drums

Yamaha Oak Custom

- 14" x 12" Mounted Tom
- 15" x 13" Mounted Tom
- 18" x 16" Floor Tom
- 24" x 17" Bass Drum
- 14" x 6.5" Mike Bordin Signature Snare (Copper Shell)

Cymbals

Zildjian

- 15" Rock Hi-Hat Bottom (Top Hat)
- 15" A Mastersound Hi-Hat Bottom
- 19" K Medium Thin Dark Crash
- 20" A Medium Crash (Brilliant)
- 21" A Sweet Ride (Brilliant)
- 22" Z Heavy Power Ride
- 19" K China

Hardware

- Yamaha Rack and Stand
- DW 5000 Delta Series Strap Drive Double Pedals

Heads

Remo

- Mounted and Floor Toms – Coated Emperor (batter), Clear Ambassador (resonant)
- Snare – Emperor-X (batter)
- Bass – P3 Clear

Sticks

- Vic Firth Rock

== Discography ==
Jerry Cantrell

- Degradation Trip (2002)
- I Want Blood (2024)

Ozzy Osbourne

- Down to Earth (2001)
- Live at Budokan (2002)
- Blizzard of Ozz (Re-recording) (2002)
- Diary of a Madman (re-recording) (2002)
- Under Cover (2005)
- Black Rain (2007)

Joe Holmes

- Joe Holmes (2026)
