= Skindred discography =

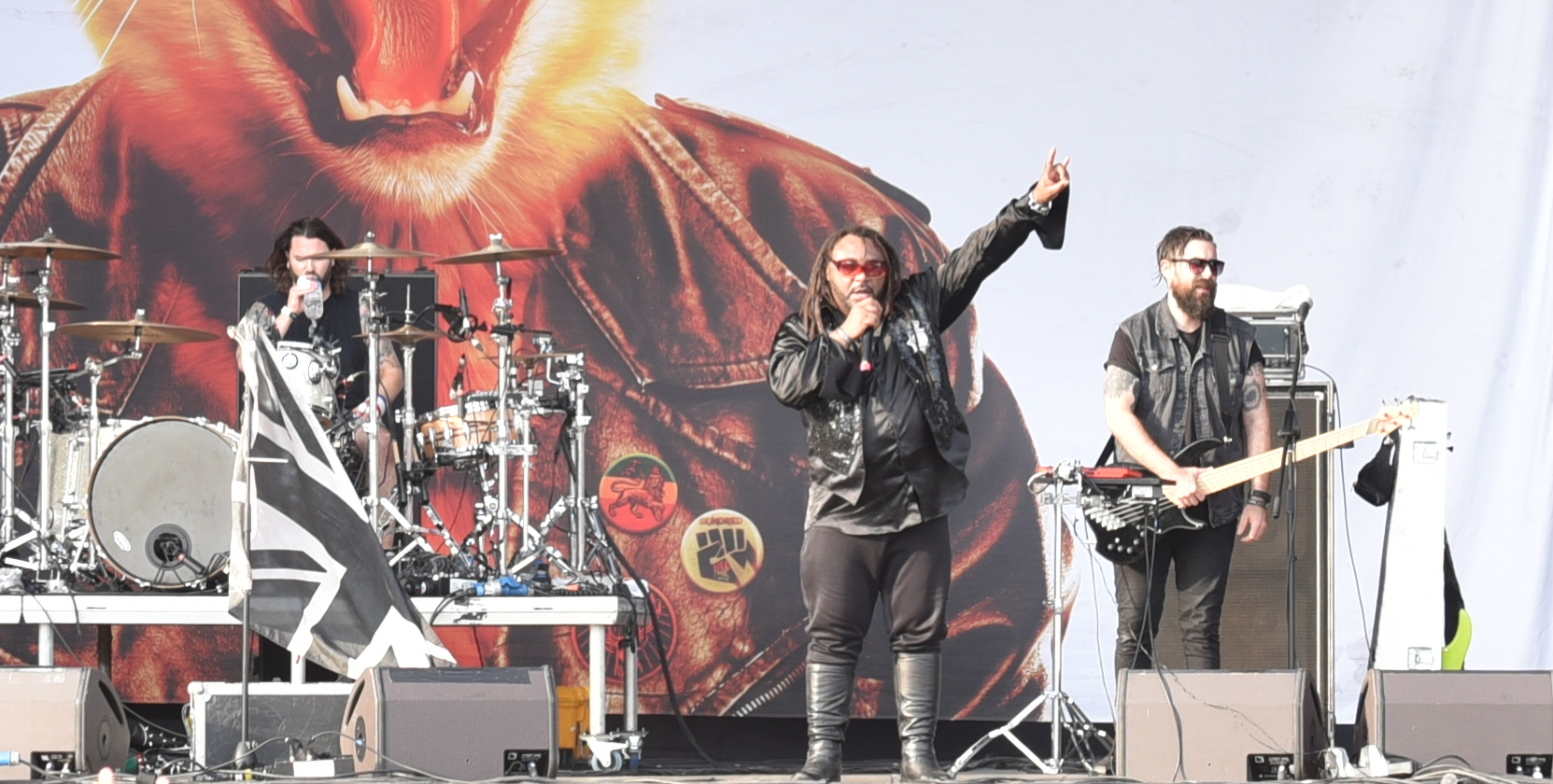
- Skindred at Elbriot 2018
- Studio albums: 9
- Soundtrack albums: 2
- Singles: 8
- Music videos: 7
- Other releases: 4

British rock band Skindred have released nine studio albums, eleven singles, and thirteen music videos. This list does not include material performed by members of Skindred that was recorded with Dub War or Raw Bud.

== Studio albums ==
Title	Album details	Peak chart positions							
Title	Album details	UK	UK Rock	UK Indie	US	US Heat.	US Ind.	US Reggae	Sales
Babylon	Release date: July 2002; Label: Lava/Bieler Bros.	—	—	—	189	11	—	1	
Roots Rock Riot	Release date: 23 October 2007; Label: Bieler Bros.	—	—	—	—	6	22	—	
Shark Bites and Dog Fights	Release date: 21 September 2009; Label: Bieler Bros.	146	—	—	—	21	45	—	
Union Black	Release date: 25 April 2011; Label: BMG	54	—	8	—	—	—	—	
Kill the Power	Release date: 27 January 2014; Label: BMG	28	3	7	—	17	—	—	
Volume	Release date: 30 October 2015; Label: Napalm	29	2	—	—	18	—	—	
Big Tings	Release date: 27 April 2018; Label: Napalm	26	1	3	—	—	—	—	
Smile	Release date: 4 August 2023; Label: Earache	2	1	1	—	—	—	2	UK: 15,519
You Got This	Release date: 17 April 2026; Label: Earache	1	1	1	—	—	—	—	UK: 20,414
"—" denotes a recording that did not chart or was not released in that territory.

== Singles ==
Year	Title	Chart positions		Album
Year	Title	US Mod.	US Main.	Album
2005	"Nobody"	23	14	Babylon
2006	"Pressure"	—	30	Babylon
2007	"Rat Race"	—	—	Roots Rock Riot
2008	"Trouble"	—	—	Roots Rock Riot
2009	"Electric Avenue"	—	—	Shark Bites and Dog Fights
2009	"Stand for Something"	—	—	Shark Bites and Dog Fights
2009	"You Can't Stop It"	—	—	Shark Bites and Dog Fights
2011	"Warning" (featuring Jacoby Shaddix)	—	—	Union Black
2011	"Cut Dem"	—	—	Union Black
2013	"Ninja"	—	—	Kill the Power
2013	"Kill the Power"	—	—	Kill the Power
2015	"Under Attack"	—	—	Volume
2018	"Machine" (featuring Phil Campbell)	—	—	Big Tings
2018	"That's My Jam"	—	23	Big Tings
2022	"Gimme That Boom"	—	38	Smile
2023	"Set Fazers"	—	—	Smile
2023	"If I Could"	—	—	Smile
2025	"You Got This"	—	36	You Got This
2026	"This Is the Sound"	—	—	You Got This
2026	"Can I Get a"	—	—	You Got This

== Music videos ==
Year	Title	Director
2003	"Set It Off"	Matt Bass
2005	"Nobody"	Wendy Morgan
2006	"Pressure"	Vem Miller
2007	"Rat Race"	Skindred
2008	"Trouble"	Ray Moody
2009	"Stand For Something"	Tim Fox - cultlovesyou
2011	"Warning"	Tim Fox
2011	"Cut Dem"	Tim Fox
2011	"You Can't Stop It"	Unknown
2012	"Doom Riff"	Unknown
2012	"Game Over"	Tim Fox
2013	"Ninja"	Dan Sturgess - DanSturgessMedia
2013	"Kill the Power"	Dan Sturgess
2014	"The Kids Are Right Now"	Dan Sturgess
2015	"Under Attack"	Unknown
2015	"Volume"	Unknown
2016	"Sound The Siren"	Dan Sturgess
2018	"Machine"	Unknown
2018	"That's My Jam"	Steve Clarke
2022	"Gimme That Boom"	Steve Clarke
2023	"Set Fazers"	Steve Clarke
2025	"You Got This"	Steve Clarke
2026	"This Is the Sound"	Matt Higgs and Very Metal Art
2026	"Can I Get a"	Steve Clarke
2026	"My People"	Matt Higgs and Very Metal Art

== Other releases ==
Year	Title	Album
2003	"Vampire Slayer"	Louder Than The Crowd
2005	"Twist And Crawl"	Sky High (Original Soundtrack)
2005	"Jungle Bells"	Taste of Christmas
2010	"Back In Black"	The Metal Forge Vol 2: A Tribute to AC/DC
2011	"Boombastic"	Feat. Forever Never
2015	"Circles" (Modestep featuring Skindred)	London Road
