= Stand for Something =

Single by Skindred

from the album Shark Bites and Dog Fights
- Released: 11 August 2009
- Recorded: 2009
- Genre: Alternative metal, reggae metal
- Length: 4:06
- Label: Bieler Bros.
- Producers: Matt La Plant, Skindred

Skindred singles chronology
"Electric Avenue" (2009)	"Stand for Something" (2009)	"You Can't Stop It" (2009)

"Stand for Something" is the first single from Skindred's 2009 album, Shark Bites and Dog Fights, released as a digital download on Myspace on August 11, 2009.

== Music video ==
The video is mostly animated in the fashion of the album art, and portrays Benji Webbe and Mikeydemus portraying Dictators, running speeches in a Hitler-esque fashion, while a Dogfight ensues between Benji's army and Mikey's army. At the climax, both leaders launch nuclear weapons and all the destroyed planes regenerate, and both sides are nearly annihilated. The video ends with Benji singing in the ruins of his city, while a few planes make the Peace Sign.

== Track listing ==
All tracks are written by Skindred.

Stand for Something
No.	Title	Length
1.	"Stand for Something"	4:06

== Personnel ==
=== Musicians ===
- Benji Webbe — Lead Vocals
- Daniel Pugsley — Bass, Programming, Backing Vocals
- Mikeydemus — Lead Guitar, Backing Vocals
- Arya Goggin — Drums
