= Nobody (Skindred song) =

Single by Skindred

from the album Babylon
- B-side: "Cure for Cancer"
- Released: 3 October 2005
- Recorded: 2002
- Genre: Nu metal; rap metal; reggae metal; dub-metal
- Length: 3:56
- Label: Bieler Bros.
- Songwriters: Martin Ford; Dan Pugsley; Jeff Rose; Benji Webbe
- Producer: Howard Benson

Skindred singles chronology
"Nobody" (2005)	"Pressure" (2006)

"Nobody" is the debut single by Welsh reggae metal band Skindred, released in 2005 from the band's debut album Babylon. It peaked at number 14 on the US Billboard Mainstream Rock Tracks chart and number 23 on its Modern Rock Tracks chart.

== Background ==
"Nobody" was one of the first Skindred songs written after the dissolution of Dub War, with bassist Daniel Pugsley coming up with the song's main idea. In an interview with Metal Hammer, vocalist Benji Webbe recalled:

We were playing bottom of the bill on all kinds of little tours, playing pubs and toilet venues, just putting ourselves out and about, you know how it is. But, wherever we went, this song Nobody was getting people moving every night. I was watching it and thinking ‘Hmm… we got a good one here!’ So, I knew when we went in to record that we had to get that song right, because I thought it could be an important one for us.

The song's inclusion on Babylon was a point of contention between Webbe and producer Howard Benson, with Benson wanting to delete the song entirely after a recording session.

== Music video ==
The music video shows the band playing with a crowd around them. The people in the crowd are dancing in different styles. As the song goes on the crowd gets closer and closer to the band until there is a moshpit while the band plays in the pit.

== Legacy ==
The song saw a resurgence in popularity in early 2023 when it became part of a dance trend on TikTok. Benji Webbe tried the dance, saying "that shit ain't easy."

== Track listing ==
CD single 1
No.	Title	Length
1.	"Nobody" (Album Version)	3:56
2.	"Cure for Cancer" (Demo)	2:07

CD single 2
No.	Title	Length
1.	"Nobody" (Album Version)	3:58
2.	"Nobody" (Dancehall Mix)	4:34
3.	"Falling Down"	3:11
4.	"Nobody" (Music Video)	3:23

Promo single
No.	Title	Length
1.	"Nobody" (Radio Dred-It)	3:18
2.	"Nobody" (Album Version)	3:56

== In popular culture ==
- The song was featured on the soundtrack for Need for Speed: Underground 2

== Personnel ==
Skindred

- Benji Webbe – vocals
- Daniel Pugsley – bass
- Mikey Demus – guitar
- Jeff Rose – guitar
- Martyn Ford – drums

Additional

- Brandon Abeln – assistant
- Howard Benson – keyboards, producer
- Aaron Bieler – A&R
- Jason Bieler – producer, mixing, A&R
- Christina Dittmar – art direction
- Martyn Ford – digital editing
- Mike Fuller – mastering
- Gersh – drum technician
- Andrew Goldman – engineer, mixing
- David Holdrege – pro-tools
- Ted Jensen – mastering
- Andrew Karp – A&R
- Per Kviman – A&R
- Jason Lader – digital editing
- Eric Miller – engineer, digital editing
- Martie Muhoberac – production coordination
- Keith Nelson – guitar technician
- Johnny O. – digital editing
- Mark Obriski – design
- Mike Plotnikoff – engineer, digital editing
- F. Scott Schafer – photography
- Rick "Soldier" Will – mixing

== Charts ==
Chart (2005–2006)	Peak position
US Hot Modern Rock Tracks (Billboard)	23
US Mainstream Rock (Billboard)	14
