= The Hierophant (album) =

Studio album by Will Haven
- Released: June 19, 2007
- Studio: Pus Cavern Studio (Sacramento, California); The Airport (Burbank, California); The Hangar (Sacramento, California)
- Genre: Alternative metal, sludge metal, noise rock, experimental rock
- Length: 51:54
- Label: Bieler Bros (874007001724)
- Producer: Shaun Lopez, Chino Moreno and Will Haven

Will Haven chronology
Carpe Diem (2001)	The Hierophant (2007)	Voir Dire (2011)

Professional ratings
Review scores
Source	Rating
SonicFrontiers.net	(8.3/10)

The Hierophant is the fourth studio album by the noise metal band Will Haven. It was released on June 19, 2007 on Bieler Bros. The album release was six years after Carpe Diem, their previous full-length. Vocalist Grady Avenell contributed to the writing of the album on several songs, but not to the recording process. Instead, he was replaced by Jeff Jaworski.

== Track listing ==
All songs written by Will Haven.

1. "Grey Sky at Night" – 1:16
2. "King's Cross" – 4:37 (Jaworski)
3. "Helena" – 2:34 (Jaworski)
4. "Hierophant" – 3:41 (Jaworski/Avenell)
5. "Caviar with Maths" – 4:07 (Jaworski)
6. "Landing on Ice" – 5:31 (Jaworski)
7. "Skinner" – 4:50 (Jaworski)
8. "Handlebars to Freedom" – 3:53 (Jaworski/Avenell)
9. "A Day Without Speaking" – 4:28 (Jaworski)
10. "Singing in Solitary" – 3:35 (Jaworski/Avenell)
11. "Sammy Davis Jr.'s One Good Eye" – 3:35 (Jaworski/Avenell)
12. "Firedealer" – 5:05 (Jaworski)
13. "Dark Sun Sets" – 4:42

== Personnel ==
=== Band members ===
- Jeff Irwin – guitar
- Jeff Jaworski – vocals
- Mike Martin – bass guitar
- Mitch Wheeler – drums and additional vocals

=== Other personnel ===
- Grady Avenell – songwriting
- Mike Fuller – mixing
- Lance Jackman – additional vocals
- Shaun Lopez – production and additional vocals
- Chino Moreno – production
- Gerri Robinson – art coordinator
- Magnus Sandberg – photography
- Antony Sarti – programming and samples
- Jared Shaltes – photography and design
- Alice Verlant-Jacq – additional vocals
