= Voir dire (disambiguation) =

Voir dire is a legal phrase for a variety of procedures connected with jury trials.

Voir Dire may also refer to:

- Voir Dire (Will Haven album), 2011
- Voir Dire (Earl Sweatshirt and the Alchemist album), 2023
- "Voir Dire" (Jury Duty), the first episode of the 2023 TV series Jury Duty
