= Will Haven =

American metal band

- Origin: Sacramento, California, U.S.
- Genres: Metalcore; post-hardcore; sludge metal
- Years active: 1995–2002; 2005–present
- Labels: Bieler Bros.; Artery
- Members: Jeff Irwin; Mitch Wheeler; Grady Avenell; Anthony 'Pag' Paganelli; Adrien Contreras; Sean Bivins
- Past members: Mike Martin; Wayne Morse; Jeff Jaworski; Cayle Hunter; Lance Jackman; Chris Fehn; Chris Robyn; Dave Hulse

Will Haven is an American metalcore band from Sacramento, California. Formed in 1995, the group released albums through several labels and toured with acts such as Deftones and Soulfly before going on hiatus in 2002. They regrouped in 2005 and have continued to record and tour since. Throughout their history, they have released seven full-length albums (the latest being VII in 2023) as well as two EPs and a live DVD. Their musical style has been described as a combination of many metal and hardcore subgenres.

== History ==
Named after a fictional, self-created character, Will Haven formed in 1995, and released a six-track demo. The band was formed from members of Sock, a band that was formed with Shaun Lopez of Far. Will Haven's debut self-titled seven-track EP was released in 1996 to positive reviews. A year later the quartet was signed to Revelation. Singer Grady Avenell guested on two Far tracks – "9 Miles", and a cover of Band Aid's "Do They Know It's Christmas Time?" with Chino Moreno of Deftones.

1997 saw the release of full-length El Diablo, bringing them an increasing amount of attention and a growing fanbase. In 1999, they released WHVN, arguably their heaviest album to date. The song "Jaworski" is named after Red Tape's frontman and friend Jeff Jaworski, who was Jeff Irwin's guitar tech at the time, and "Slopez" is named after Shaun Lopez. During this time, the band recorded a track called "The Regulator" for the Bad Brains tribute album Never Give In, and toured with Deftones throughout Europe.

In 2000, long-time drummer Wayne Morse left the band. He was replaced by Mitch Wheeler. Later that year, Avenell guested on Soulfly's track "Pain", featured on the album Primitive, along with Chino Moreno.

In 2001, they released the critically acclaimed Carpe Diem, accompanied by a world tour with shows in the US, UK, and Japan, and playing the Vans Warped Tour in Australia. Single "Carpe Diem" featured Chino Moreno in the promotional video. Members of Will Haven also appeared in the video for Deftones' "Bored" from their album Adrenaline.

Grady Avenell left not long after the tour to raise a family and attend college. Will Haven released a DVD called Foreign Films, featuring what at that point was to be their last ever show in January 2003 – in a small coffeehouse in their hometown of Sacramento called The Capitol Garage – and a wealth of footage from the final tour. Members of the band went on to form Ghostride (with members of Tinfed and Oddman), The Abominable Iron Sloth and Death Valley High, as well as starting their own label, Distruktor Records.

=== Regrouping ===
On October 12, 2005, Will Haven officially regrouped and began writing new songs with Grady Avenell. They had initially planned to release a five-song EP, but during the writing process decided to put out a full-length album. Now a five-piece with guitarist Cayle Hunter from Ghostride and Oddman, they went to Los Angeles to record 12 songs for the album. Guitarist Jeff Irwin told Rock Sound, "If this is the last record we ever do, then i want it to be our ultimate one – the one that's absolutely perfect".

In January 2006, Haven returned to the stage with a show in Sacramento's Boardwalk. In February, new song "Handlebars to Freedom" was uploaded to their MySpace profile. In March, they traveled to the UK for a co-headlining tour with Crowbar. Avenell was unable to perform at the Will Haven dates in Glasgow and Newport due to problems with his wife in Paris, so Simon Neil of Biffy Clyro, Craig B of Aereogramme, Mikey Dee of Skindred, Crowbar frontman Kirk Windstein and XSheepX of The Seventh Cross performed guest vocals both nights. Grady rejoined the band at the following dates. The band had plans for tours through Europe and Australia and a summer tour with Deftones, but this never transpired.

In August 2006, Will Haven signed with indie label Bieler Bros. Records. A demo from this time, "Handlebars To Freedom", appeared on a compilation from a new Australian label, Static Migration Records. Second guitarist Cayle Hunter was fired by the band and shifted focus to his band Armed for the Apocalypse.

On February 19, 2007, Will Haven played a free show at the Troubadour in Los Angeles, promising a "big announcement" would be made at the show – namely that Avenell had left the band and been replaced by longtime friend of the band (and vocalist for Sacramento punk band Red Tape) Jeff Jaworski. In spring 2007, the band went to Europe with Deftones.

The band released the album The Hierophant on June 18, 2007 in the UK and the following day in the US. A post by guitarist Jeff Irwin on an unofficial message board stated that they intended to tour the new material later on in 2007. A headline UK tour eventually followed in November 2007 without Mike Martin on bass. No explanation was given for his absence. Bass duties for the tour were covered by long-time friend Rey Osburn of Tinfed.

In September 2008, Will Haven embarked on a headlining European tour with French band My Own Private Alaska. Osburn again played bass, as Mike Martin was raising a family.

In a statement on October 12, 2009, the band announced Avenell would rejoin: "After a little time off and doing a few benefit shows for our brother Chi Cheng of the Deftones, we are back to work. As some of you may have seen Grady did join us for a few of the benefit shows we did for Chi and also an amazing show in San Francisco a few months ago. After those shows we had a few discussions about will havens future and Grady expressed that he would like to be a part of it. So after working out details I am very happy to say that we are currently working on a new record with Grady handling the vocal duties. Jeff Jaworski will still be a big part of the band and helping with the writing process on the new record. So we are more than excited to be all working together on making an amazing record." In April 2010, they announced that Chris Fehn would replace Mike Martin on bass for the upcoming album and tours. The album Voir Dire was released by Bieler Bros. on October 10, 2011, with a vinyl release via Holy Roar the following year.

An EP titled Open the Mind to Discomfort was released in May 2015 via Artery Recordings.

Their sixth album Muerte was released via Minus Head Records in March 2018, with guest appearances from Mike Scheidt of Yob and Stephen Carpenter of Deftones. Their seventh album, VII, was released on July 7, 2023, again via Minus Head. A Carpe Diem/VII tour of the US was announced for August 2023, with UK and French dates to follow in October. On October 4, 2024, the band released a single, "KIRE", ahead of a compilation titled No Stars To Guide Me: 30 Years Of WHVN, which was released through Minus Head on December 6.

== Musical style ==
Will Haven has been described as metalcore, sludge metal, post-hardcore, hardcore, noise rock, noisecore, alternative metal, groove metal, and nu metal.

== Members ==
=== Current members ===
- Grady Avenell – vocals (1995–2002, 2005–2007, 2009–present)
- Jeff Irwin – guitar (1995–2002, 2005–present)
- Mitch Wheeler – drums (2000–2002, 2005–present)
- Anthony Paganelli – guitar (2007–present)
- Adrien Contreras – bass (2012–present), keyboards (2010–2012)
- Sean Bivins – keyboards, guitar (2023–present)

=== Former members ===
- Mike Martin – bass (1995–2002, 2005–2010)
- Jeff Jaworski – vocals (2007–2009)
- Cayle Hunter – guitar (2005–2006)
- Wayne Morse – drums (1995–2000)
- Dave Hulse – drums (2000)
- Chris Robyn – drums (2000)
- Chris Fehn – bass (2010–2012)

=== Touring members ===
- Reyka Osburn Bigfeather – bass (2008–2009)

== Discography ==
=== Studio albums ===
Year	Album details	UK Albums Chart
1997	El Diablo: Released: August 19, 1997; Label: Crisis; Format: CD, CS, LP	—
1999	WHVN: Released: September 14, 1999; Label: Revelation, Music for Nations; Format: CD, LP	127
2001	Carpe Diem: Released: October 23, 2001; Label: Revelation, Music for Nations; Format: CD	176
2007	The Hierophant: Released: June 19, 2007; Label: Bieler Bros.; Format: CD	—
2011	Voir Dire: Released: October 10, 2011 / January 30, 2012 (LP); Label: Bieler Bros., Holy Roar; Format: CD, LP	—
2018	Muerte: Released: March 23, 2018; Label: Minus Head Records; Format: CD, LP	—
2023	VII: Released: July 7, 2023; Label: Minus Head Records; Format: CD, LP	—
"—" denotes a release that did not chart.

=== Demo albums ===
Year	Album details
1995	Will Haven demo: Released: 1995; Format: CD
2000	The Best Song on Here demo: Released: 2000; Format: CD

=== EPs ===
Year	EP details
1996	Will Haven: Released: 1996; Format: CD
2015	Open the Mind to Discomfort: Released: May 19, 2015; Label: Artery Recordings; Format: CD, 12"

=== Singles ===
Year	Song	Album
2001	"Carpe Diem"	Carpe Diem
2011	"Mida's Secret"	Voir Dire

=== Video albums ===
Year	Album details
2003	Foreign Films: Released: 2003; Format: DVD

=== Other appearances ===
- 1995 – Far – Grady guests on the song "9 Miles"
- 1995 – Far - The Bands That Stole Christmas – Grady guests on "Do They Know It's Christmas?" together with Chino Moreno from Deftones
- 1999 – Every Day Life - Moment of Clarity – Gady guests on the song "Relocate"
- 2000 – Soulfly - Primitive – Grady guests on "Pain" together with Chino Moreno from Deftones
- 2021 – Frontierer - Oxidized – Grady guests on the song "This Magnetic Drift"

=== Music videos ===
- "Carpe Diem" (2001)
- "Held To Answer" (2011)
- "When The Walls Close In " (2012)
- "El Sol" (2018)
- "Hewed with the Brand" (2018)
- "Winds of Change" (2019)
- "Wings of Mariposa" (2022)
- "5 of Fire" (2023)
- "Diablito" (2023)
- "No Stars To Guide Me" (2023)
