= Voir Dire (Will Haven album) =

Studio album by Will Haven
- Released: October 10, 2011
- Studios: Puss Cavern Studios (Sacramento, California); Studio 24 (Sacramento, California)
- Genres: Sludge metal; noise rock; experimental rock; alternative metal
- Length: 39:52
- Labels: Bieler Bros.; Holy Roar
- Producers: Matt Pedri; Will Haven

Will Haven chronology
Hierophant (2007)	Voir Dire (2011)	Muerte (2018)

Professional ratings
Review scores
Source	Rating
Sputnikmusic	4.5/5 stars
Dom Lawson (Metal Hammer)	(Positive)
Thrash Hits	5.5/6 stars
Drowned in Sound	8/10 stars
Rock Sound	8/10 stars

Voir Dire is the fifth studio album by the heavy metal band Will Haven. It was released in 2011 on Bieler Bros. Records. It is the first album to feature frontman Grady Avenell since 2001's critically acclaimed Carpe Diem, and also features new bassist Chris Fehn (then-percussionist of Slipknot). The album was well received by critics, and featured in Metal Hammer's top 50 albums of 2011. The LP edition of the album was issued by Holy Roar Records in 2012.

== Track listing ==
All lyrics are written by Grady Avenell; all music is composed by Will Haven.

No.	Title	Length
1.	"Held to Answer"	3:26
2.	"When the Walls Close In"	4:03
3.	"Urban Agoge"	3:22
4.	"The Siege"	3:38
5.	"A Beautiful Death"	4:07
6.	"Object of My Affection"	3:19
7.	"Mida's Secret"	2:55
8.	"Lives Left to Wither"	5:12
9.	"Harvesting Our Burdens"	3:40
10.	"Lost"	6:05
Total length:		39:52

== Personnel ==
Will Haven

- Grady Avenell – vocals
- Jeff Irwin – guitars, keyboards, piano
- Mitch Wheeler – drums
- Chris Fehn – bass guitar
- Anthony "Pag" Paganelli – guitar
- Adrien Contreras – keyboards

Production

- Matt Pedri – engineering, production
- Will Haven – production
- Ryan Smith – mastering
- Jason Broussard – artwork, photography
- Chance Phillips – artwork, photography
