= VII (Will Haven album) =

Studio album by Will Haven
- Released: July 7, 2023
- Recorded: 2022–23
- Studio: Pus Cavern (Sacramento, CA)
- Genre: Noise metal; sludge metal
- Length: 33:44
- Label: Minus Head
- Producer: Joe Johnston; Will Haven (co.)

Will Haven chronology
| Muerte (2018) | VII (2023) |

Singles from VII
- 1. "Wings of Mariposa" Released: May 27, 2022; 2. "5 of Fire" Released: May 5, 2023; 3. "Diablito" Released: June 6, 2023

Professional ratings
Review scores
| Source | Rating |
|---|---|
| Blabbermouth.net | 8/10 |
| Distorted Sound | 8/10 |
| Ghost Cult | 7/10 |
| Kerrang! | 4/5 |
| Lambgoat | 7/10 |
| Scream Blast Repeat | 8/10 |
| This Day in Metal | 8/10 |

VII (Roman numeral for the number 7) is the seventh studio album by American noise rock band Will Haven. It was released on July 7, 2023, through Minus Head Records, making it the band's second album for the label. Recording sessions took place at Pus Cavern in Sacramento, California. Production was handled by Joe Johnston with the band themselves serving as co-producers. It features guest vocal appearance from Rey Osburn of Death Valley High on the song "Evolution of a Man". The album was preceded by three singles: "Wings of Mariposa", "5 of Fire" and "Diablito". The latter has lyrics based on the band's 1997 debut album El Diablo, written on the 25th anniversary of the album's release.

== Track listing ==
| No. | Title | Length |
|---|---|---|
| 1. | "Luna" | 1:49 |
| 2. | "5 of Fire" | 3:22 |
| 3. | "For All Future Time" | 2:33 |
| 4. | "Evolution of a Man" | 3:05 |
| 5. | "Paloma's Blessing" | 3:07 |
| 6. | "Wings of Mariposa" | 2:46 |
| 7. | "Diablito" | 3:29 |
| 8. | "Diablito II" | 1:06 |
| 9. | "No Stars to Guide Me" | 4:38 |
| 10. | "Feeding the Soil" | 4:45 |
| 11. | "La Ultima Nota" | 3:00 |
| Total length: | | 33:44 |

== Personnel ==
Will Haven – co-producers, mixing

- Grady Avenell – vocals
- Jeff Irwin – backing vocals, guitar, keyboards
- Adrien Contreras – bass
- Mitch Wheeler – drums
- Sean Bivins – keyboards, piano
  - Reykjavik Osburn Bigfeather – backing vocals (track 4)
  - Joe Johnston – producer, engineering, mixing
  - Alan Douches – mastering
  - Michael Cobra – design, photography

== Charts ==
| Chart (2023) | Peak position |
|---|---|
| UK Album Downloads (OCC) | 73 |
