= Wide Eye Panic =

- Origin: Olympia, Washington, United States
- Genres: Heavy metal, alternative metal
- Years active: 2003-present
- Labels: Bieler Bros. Records
- Past members: Aram Wheeler; Mark Mauer; Karl Penn; Randy Bebich; Andrew Kuhn

Wide Eye Panic is an American alternative metal band from Olympia, Washington, United States, that formed in 2003. After forming and writing a few original songs, they started playing many gigs in cities and towns surrounding Olympia, such as Lacey, Seattle, Tacoma, and Kent. In the summer of 2005, they released their first independent album, entitled Distorted View. In March 2008, they released their sophomore album The Process, which includes their first successful local radio single, "Question B9". In late 2009, Wide Eye Panic was signed to Bieler Bros. Records. Their third album Modus Operandi was released on February 16, 2010. After a brief hiatus they released their fourth and final album Dissolve on July 9, 2013. The group has been inactive since 2014.

== Band members ==
- Aram Wheeler - Vocals
- Mark Mauer - Bass Guitar/Backup Vocals
- Karl Penn - Guitar
- Randy Bebich - Guitar
- Andrew Kuhn - Percussion

== Discography ==
=== Independent albums ===
- Distorted View (2005)
- The Process (2008)

=== Studio albums ===
- Modus Operandi (2010)
- Dissolve (2013)
