= WHVN (album) =

Studio album by Will Haven
- Released: September 14, 1999
- Studio: The Hanger (Sacramento, California); The Appliance Shop (Los Angeles, California)
- Genre: Sludge metal; noise rock; experimental rock; art metal
- Length: 57:23
- Label: Music For Nations (CDMFN 255)
- Producer: Eric Stenman and Will Haven

Will Haven chronology
El Diablo (1997)	WHVN (1999)	Carpe Diem (2001)

Professional ratings
Review scores
Source	Rating
Allmusic	3/5 stars

WHVN is the second studio album by the heavy metal band Will Haven, released on September 14, 1999. In 2021, it was named one of the 20 best metal albums of 1999 by Metal Hammer magazine.

== Track listing ==
All tracks written by Will Haven, except where noted.

1. "Fresno" – 5:31
2. "If She Could Speak" – 3:08
3. "Jaworski" – 2:35
4. "Slopez" – 7:09
5. "End Summary" – 2:50
6. "Subtitles" – 1:11 (Stenman)
7. "Genesis 11" – 3:34
8. "Dallass Drake" – 4:00
9. "Death Do Us Part" – 5:12
10. "Muse" – 3:25
11. "Miguel Abburido" – 8:45
12. "I've Seen My Fate (Appliance Remix)" – 5:41
13. "Sign Off" – 4:20

== Personnel ==
=== Band members ===
- Grady Avenell – vocals
- Jeff Irwin – guitar and piano
- Mike Martin – bass guitar
- Wayne Morse – drums

=== Other personnel ===
- Adam Federico – drum circle on "Slopez"
- Jeff Jaworski – backing vocals on "Jaworski"
- Eric Stenman – production, engineering and programming
- Charlie Watts – mastering
- Jennifer Woodruff – additional vocals on "Slopez"
