= Muerte (album) =

Studio album by Will Haven
- Released: March 23, 2018
- Genre: Alternative metal; sludge metal; metalcore
- Length: 47:10
- Label: Minus Head
- Producer: Will Haven

Will Haven chronology
Voir Dire (2011)	Muerte (2018)	VII (2023)

Professional ratings
Review scores
Source	Rating
Distorted Sound	8/10
Hardbeat	7/10
Metal Hammer	4/5 stars
Metal Injection	9/10
Sputnikmusic	3/5

Muerte (Spanish word for "Death") is the sixth studio album by hardcore punk/heavy metal band Will Haven. It was released in 2018 on Minus Head Records. It is the first album in which keyboardist Adrien Contreras plays bass guitar. The album was well received by critics. Vocalist Grady Avenell has talked about Muerte being the final album by the band, though that has been confirmed false with the release of the band's seventh album VII in 2023.

== Track listing ==
No.	Title	Length
1.	"Hewed with the Brand"	3:26
2.	"Winds of Change"	4:22
3.	"Kinney"	3:33
4.	"The Son"	3:38
5.	"43"	4:26
6.	"No Escape"	5:00
7.	"Unit K"	3:49
8.	"Ladwig No. 949"	4:06
9.	"Bootstraps"	3:24
10.	"Now in the Ashes"	5:21
11.	"El Sol"	6:05
Total length:		47:10

== Personnel ==
Will Haven

- Grady Avenell – vocals
- Jeff Irwin – guitar
- Anthony Paganelli – guitar
- Adrien Contreras – bass, keyboards
- Mitch Wheeler – drums

Guests

- Mike Scheidt – vocals on "No Escape"
- Stephen Carpenter – guitar on "El Sol"
