= Union Black =

Studio album by Skindred
- Released: 25 April 2011
- Recorded: Britannia Row Studios
- Genre: Nu metal; reggae rock; electronic rock
- Length: 46:01
- Label: BMG
- Producer: James Loughrey

Skindred chronology
Shark Bites and Dog Fights (2009)	Union Black (2011)	Kill The Power (2014)

Singles from Union Black
- 1. "Warning" Released: 6 April 2011; 2. "Cut Dem" Released: 1 July 2011; 3. "Doom Riff" Released: 31 January 2012; 4. "Game Over" Released: 18 May 2012

Union Black is the fourth album from Welsh reggae metal band Skindred. It was released on 25 April 2011 in the United Kingdom and on 1 July 2011 in Europe. The album is notable for featuring more usage of dubstep, hip hop and drum and bass elements than previous works.

== Background ==
The album was produced by James Loughrey at Britannia Row Studios. Benji Webbe stated in an interview with Kerrang! that he wanted to get some collaborations on the new album and had originally hoped to get Corey Taylor of Slipknot and Stone Sour to sing on the album, but due to other commitments this was not possible. He went on to say that after sending an incomplete version of the song "Warning" to friend Jacoby Shaddix (of Papa Roach), Shaddix flew into the studio to record some extra vocals for the track. After the alterations, "Warning" was released as the first single from the album, was debuted on BBC Radio 1's Rock show with Daniel P Carter and has subsequently received airtime on BBC 6 Music and BBC Guernsey, being played by Don Letts and Bruce Dickinson. The video debuted on YouTube on 6 April. The album's art is contributed by graphic artist Tim Fox. The album was promoted with a UK tour, with support acts Chiodos and Me Vs Hero. On 30 June, the band's official Facebook page released "Doom Riff" as a free download, and the day after, on 1 July, the video for "Cut Dem" was released as the second single from the album. On 6 September the band announced a deal with Australian Record label with 3 Wise/Sony Records to release the album on 23 September, along with the announcement of their tour with Hollywood Undead after the cancellation of 2011's Soundwave Revolution.

== Critical reception ==
Professional ratings
Review scores
Source	Rating
AllMusic	3/5 stars
Rockfreaks.net	6.5/10
Rock Sound	8/10
The NewReview	4.5/5

The album has been well received. The NewReview gave the album 4.5 out of 5, remarking that "there is nothing similar to Union Black".

== Track listing ==
All tracks are written by Skindred.

No.	Title	Length
1.	"Union Black" (Intro)	1:10
2.	"Warning" (featuring Jacoby Shaddix of Papa Roach)	3:50
3.	"Cut Dem"	3:51
4.	"Doom Riff"	3:48
5.	"Living a Lie"	4:26
6.	"Guntalk"	4:01
7.	"Own You"	3:32
8.	"Make Your Mark"	3:41
9.	"Get It Now"	4:58
10.	"Bad Man Ah Bad Man"	3:30
11.	"Death to All Spies"	5:05
12.	"Game Over"	4:09

iTunes bonus track
No.	Title	Length
13.	"110%"	4:01

Deluxe Edition bonus tracks
No.	Title	Length
13.	"110%"	4:01
14.	"Game Over" (Subsource Remix)	4:10
15.	"Rat Race" (Live at HMV Forum, 2011)	7:48

Deluxe Edition DVD
No.	Title	Length
1.	"Warning" (official video)
2.	"Cut Dem" (official video)
3.	"Doom Riff" (official video)
4.	"Cut Dem" (making of the official video)
5.	"Cut Dem" (Live at HMV Forum, 2011)
6.	"Warning" (Live at Download Festival, 2011)
7.	"Nobody" (Live at Polish Woodstock, 2011)
8.	"Rat Race" (Live at HMV Forum, 2011)

== Personnel ==
- Benji Webbe – vocals, synthesiser
- Daniel Pugsley – bass
- Mikey Demus – guitar, backing vocals
- Dirty Arya – drums

=== Additional personnel ===
- Jacoby Shaddix – additional vocals on track 2
- James Loughrey – production, engineering
- John Cox – assistant engineer
- Tim Fox – design

== Chart performance ==
Chart performance
Chart (2011)	Peak position
UK Albums (OCC)	54
UK Independent Albums (OCC)	8
UK Rock & Metal Albums (OCC)	4
