= Babylon (Skindred album) =

- 2002 release cover

Studio album by Skindred
- Released: 3 July 2002
- Studio: Bay 7, Valley Village, California; Sparky Dark, Calabasas, California
- Genre: Nu metal; reggae metal; rap metal
- Length: 51:06
- Label: BMG; RCA
- Producer: Howard Benson

Skindred chronology
Babylon (2002)	Roots Rock Riot (2007)

Babylon
- 2004 release cover

Singles from Babylon
- 1. "Nobody" Released: 3 October 2005; 2. "Pressure" Released: 6 February 2006

Babylon is the debut studio album by Welsh heavy metal band Skindred. The band was formed from members of the disbanded band Dub War, including leader Benji Webbe, and signed to RCA Records in 2002, who released the album on 3 July. The band felt that they were being treated poorly by the label, and left in 2004, signing with Bieler Bros. Records, who released the album internationally in association with Lava Records. Each version released featured a significantly altered track listing.

Promotion of the album included performing on a tour led by Korn. Two singles were released: "Nobody" and "Pressure", for which music videos were produced. Babylon has been well received by critics for its fusion of alternative metal and reggae. In 2004, the album peaked at number one on the Billboard Top Reggae Albums chart, number five on the Top Heatseekers chart and at number 189 on the Billboard 200. In 2006, the album again ranked at number one on the Top Reggae Albums chart.

== History ==
Singer Benji Webbe formed Skindred in 1998 with bassist Daniel Pugsley, guitarist Jeff Rose and drummer Martyn "Ginge" Ford after Webbe was unable to put together a new project featuring other members of his former band, Dub War. Skindred recorded their debut album, Babylon, with producer Howard Benson. The album was first released in 2002 by RCA Records, and reissued in 2003 with an altered track listing, achieving some success in Europe and amongst fans of heavy metal in the underground music scene in the United States. Band members Martyn "Ginge" Ford and Jeff Rose left the band following the release of the album, citing poor treatment by RCA. The band left RCA to sign with Bieler Bros. Records, who released the album internationally in association with Lava Records in 2004. This version featured different artwork, removed the songs "Falling Down," "Kiss and Make Up," and "Together", and included new interludes featuring dancehall musicians Jatoman Busha and Herbius Darussalam, and four new songs: "Start First", "We Want", "Tears" and "The Beginning of Sorrows".

== Music ==
Babylon features a style which the band refers to as "ragga metal", fusing heavy metal, punk rock and reggae influences. Benji Webbe has also jokingly referred to the band's musical style as "nu-reggae", in reference to the term nu metal. In his review of the album, AllMusic critic Johnny Loftus wrote that Babylon brought a new edge to the "blasé world" of rap rock, writing that "Emerging from the ashes of Dub War, Benji Webbe and company eschew that band's fetish for freely shifting sounds, in favor of a more focused ragga-rap-metal attack. It's not merely a facsimile of last year's money-making metal model. No, what little repetition does exist here comes from the dancehall influence, the harping and chatting over a nonstop groove."

IGN reviewer Justin Falzon compares Webbe to "a flexible mesh of Jonathan Davis and Beenie Man", writing that "comparing his apparent vocal mastery to any one (or two) artists is nigh impossible. He screams, he wails, he growls, he rolls, and he jumps all over the register at will; it's an altogether astounding virtuoso performance. Unfortunately the music itself - slightly less funk than 311, slightly more punk than Limp Bizkit, and much more reggae than both - can't possibly keep up with Webbe's vocal apocalypse."

== Release ==
Skindred toured in promotion of the album alongside Breaking Benjamin, Chevelle and Instruction, in a tour led by Korn. The band also performed on Late Night with Conan O'Brien. The first single from the album, "Nobody", was released on 3 October 2005. A second edition of the single was released the same day, containing a remix of the song. A music video for "Nobody" was produced, and appeared in solid rotation on Fuse TV and MTV2.

The second single from the album, "Pressure", was released as a 7" on 6 February 2006. It contained the album version of the song and the "Happy Roses Baggy Mix" of "World Domination". A CD single of "Pressure" was released on 6 February 2006. It contained the album version of the song, the "Drum N Bass Fix Pressure" remix, and the non-album track "Rude Boy 4 Life", as well as an enhanced CD feature containing the song's music video.

In the United States, the album charted at #1 on the Billboard Top Reggae Albums chart, #5 on the Top Heatseekers chart and at #189 on the Billboard 200, and the single "Nobody" peaked at #14 on the Mainstream Rock Tracks chart and at #23 on the Modern Rock Tracks chart in 2004. In 2005, the single "Pressure" peaked at #30 on the Hot Mainstream Rock Tracks chart. In 2006, Babylon once again charted at #1 on the Top Reggae Albums chart.

== Reception ==
Professional ratings
Review scores
Source	Rating
AllMusic	4/5 stars
Audio Video Revolution	7.5/10 stars
IGN	(7.7/10)

Critical response to the album was positive. AllMusic critic Johnny Loftus wrote that "Skindred doesn't seem to consciously want the reinvention tag; it has simply tapped into the same lack of pretension that fueled Korn and Living Colour's Vivid -- records that were made visionary by an unadulterated honesty in both delivery and craft. [...] highly recommended for fans of literate genre jumpers like Soulfly and System of a Down, or any heshers looking for some heavy-hitting firepower that hasn't fallen victim to the anvil of corporate assimilation." IGN reviewer Justin Falzon called the album "a welcome attempt to innovate today's mainstream metal", writing that it "can be decidedly erratic, but nonetheless fascinating and difficult to dismiss" and concludes that "Skindred manages to place themselves outside the cookie-cutter conventions, nearly pulling off something fresh in the process."

Audio Video Revolution reviewer Paul Lingas wrote that "most of the tracks are somewhat short, but too many of them blend one right into the other and end up sounding like noise [...] look for Skindred to plant themselves firmly on the map with this debut album." TuneLab reviewer Jay described Babylon as "Party beach-type music for metalheads", and Eagle Eye reviewer Edward Savoy called Skindred "the musically enlightened head-bangers dream".

== Track listing ==
Three editions of the album were released, each with a different track listing.

- All songs written by Skindred except where noted.

No.	Title	Music	Length
1.	"Set It Off"		3:03
2.	"Kiss and Make Up"		3:43
3.	"Pressure"		3:22
4.	"Sicker"		4:00
5.	"Selector"		2:23
6.	"Babylon"		3:34
7.	"The Fear"	Skindred; Strummer; Jones; Simonon; Headon	3:46
8.	"Bruises"		2:42
9.	"Together"		3:31
10.	"World Domination"		2:24
11.	"Nobody: "Vampire Killa"		8:18
Total length:			48:17

- "The Fear" contains elements sampled from "London Calling"
- "Vampire Killa" is a Hidden track.

2003 edition
No.	Title	Lyrics	Music	Length
1.	"Set It Off"	Skindred	Skindred	3:03
2.	"Nobody"	Skindred	Skindred	3:56
3.	"Babylon"	Skindred	Skindred	3:34
4.	"Selector"	Skindred	Skindred	2:23
5.	"Firing the Love"	Skindred	Skindred	3:37
6.	"Pressure"	Skindred	Skindred	3:31
7.	"Bruises"	Skindred	Skindred	2:42
8.	"The Fear"	Skindred	Skindred; Strummer; Jones; Simonon; Headon	3:46
9.	"Falling Down"	Skindred	Skindred	3:12
10.	"Kiss and Make Up"	Skindred	Skindred	3:43
11.	"World Domination"	Skindred	Skindred	2:24
12.	"Together: "Brainkiller"	Skindred	Skindred	7:44
Total length:				43:55

- "Brainkiller" is a Hidden track.

2004 edition^{a}
No.	Title	Lyrics	Music	Producer	Length
1.	"Intro"		Ginge; Benji; Dan	Jason Bieler; Skindred	0:28
2.	"Nobody"	Skindred	Skindred	Howard Benson	3:56
3.	"Pressure"	Skindred	Skindred	Howard Benson	3:31
4.	"Start First"	Skindred	Skindred	Jason Bieler; Skindred	2:49
5.	"Interlude 1" (featuring Herbius Darussalam)			Jason Bieler; Skindred	0:16
6.	"Selector"	Skindred	Skindred	Howard Benson	2:23
7.	"Bruises"	Skindred	Skindred	Howard Benson	2:42
8.	"We Want"	Skindred	Skindred	Jason Bieler; Skindred	3:01
9.	"Interlude 2" (featuring Jatoman Busha)			Jason Bieler; Skindred	0:28
10.	"Set It Off"	Skindred	Skindred	Howard Benson	3:03
11.	"Firing the Love"	Skindred	Skindred	Howard Benson	3:37
12.	"Tears"	Skindred	Skindred	Jason Bieler; Skindred	3:00
13.	"World Domination"	Skindred	Skindred	Howard Benson	2:24
14.	"The Fear"	Skindred	Skindred; Strummer; Jones; Simonon; Headon	Howard Benson	3:46
15.	"Interlude 3"		Ginge; Benji	Jason Bieler; Skindred	0:26
16.	"Babylon"	Skindred	Skindred	Howard Benson	3:34
17.	"The Beginning of Sorrows: "Pressure (Acoustic)"	Skindred	Skindred	Jason Bieler; Skindred	11:06
Total length:					51:06

- "Pressure (Acoustic)" appears as a Hidden track.

== Personnel ==
Information taken from AllMusic.

=== Musicians ===
- Benji Webbe — vocals
- Daniel Pugsley — bass
- Mikey Demus — guitar
- Jeff Rose — guitar
- Martyn "Ginge" Ford — drums

=== Additional personnel ===
- Brandon Abeln — assistant
- Howard Benson — keyboards, producer
- Aaron Bieler — A&R
- Jason Bieler — producer, mixing, A&R
- Christina Dittmar — art direction
- Martyn Ford — digital editing
- Mike Fuller — mastering
- Gersh — drum technician
- Andrew Goldman — engineer, mixing
- David Holdrege — pro-tools
- Ted Jensen — mastering
- Andrew Karp — A&R
- Per Kviman — A&R
- Jason Lader — digital editing
- Eric Miller — engineer, digital editing
- Martie Muhoberac — production coordination
- Keith Nelson — guitar technician
- Johnny O. — digital editing
- Mark Obriski — design
- Mike Plotnikoff — engineer, digital editing
- F. Scott Schafer — photography
- Rick "Soldier" Will — mixing

== Charts ==
Chart (2002)	Peak position
UK Rock & Metal Albums (Official Charts)	21

Chart (2004)	Peak position
US Billboard 200	189
US Heatseekers Albums (Billboard)	5
US Reggae Albums (Billboard)	1

== Notes ==
- ^a This track listing reflects the United Kingdom release, as the version released in the United States does not contain the track "We Want".
