= Shark Bites and Dog Fights =

Studio album by Skindred
- Released: 1 September 2009
- Recorded: 2008–09
- Studio: Bieler Bros. Studios, Pompano Beach, Florida
- Genre: Alternative metal, reggae, nu metal
- Length: 31:00
- Label: Bieler Bros.
- Producer: Matt LaPlant, Skindred

Skindred chronology
Roots Rock Riot (2007)	Shark Bites and Dog Fights (2009)	Union Black (2011)

Singles from Shark Bites and Dog Fights
- 1. "Electric Avenue" Released: 2009; 2. "Stand for Something" Released: 11 August 2009; 3. "You Can't Stop It" Released: 18 September 2009

Professional ratings
Review scores
Source	Rating
AltSounds	51% link
Metal Hammer	8/10
Q	3/5 stars
Sonic Dice	link
Sphere Mag	link

Shark Bites and Dog Fights is the third studio album by Welsh band Skindred, released in September 2009.

== Singles ==
"Electric Avenue", a cover of the song by Eddy Grant, was released as a single earlier in the year, and "Days Like These" was originally released on the Japanese edition of Roots Rock Riot. The first single, "Stand for Something", was released on 11 August 2009.

== Background ==
On 15 September 2009, in an interview with Rock Sins, Benji stated that "One thing about this record and particular album, is that we had 3 weeks to actually record it before we set off on a US tour. The music was recorded and we all were happy with the way it sounded, but 60 percent of the lyrics and melodies were not in place or written so Matt LePlant [the producer] came out and set up his studio in the back of the tour bus. We worked on the songs together."

== Track listing ==
All tracks are written by Skindred (Benji Webbe, Michael Fry, Daniel Pugsley, and Arya Goggin), except "Electric Avenue" by Eddy Grant.

Title
No.	Title	Length
1.	"Stand for Something"	4:06
2.	"You Can't Stop It"	3:53
3.	"Electric Avenue" (Eddy Grant Cover)	3:10
4.	"Calling All Stations"	3:34
5.	"Corrupted"	3:36
6.	"Who Are You?"	5:04
7.	"Days Like These"	3:36
8.	"Invincible"	3:58
Total length:		31:00

== Personnel ==
Skindred

- Clive "Benji" Webbe – Vocals
- Michael John "Mikeydemus" Fry – Guitar
- Daniel Pugsley – Bass, Electronic
- Arya "Dirty Arya" Goggin – Drums

Production

- Produced by Matt LaPlant and Skindred
- Engineered & mixed by Matt LaPlant and Mike Leslie
- Mastered by Michael Fuller, at Fuller Sound, Miami, Florida
- Additional composer: Eddy Grant on track 3
- Management by Bieler Group, Inc.
- Business management by Sharon Gilday and Dan Martin (Down To Earth)
- A&R by Jason and Aaron Bieler
- Artwork & design by Tim Fox
- Art co-ordinator: Gerri Robinson

== Charts ==
Chart (2009)	Peak position
UK Independent Albums (OCC)	20
UK Rock & Metal Albums (OCC)	17
US Heatseekers Albums (Billboard)	21
US Independent Albums (Billboard)	45
