= Big Tings =

Studio album by Skindred
- Released: 27 April 2018
- Studio: Real World Studios, Box
- Genre: Nu metal, rock and roll
- Length: 37:27
- Label: Napalm
- Producer: James Loughrey

Skindred chronology
Volume (2015)	Big Tings (2018)	Smile (2023)

Singles from Big Tings
- 1. "Machine" Released: 16 February 2018; 2. "Big Tings" Released: 23 March 2018; 3. "That's My Jam" Released: 17 April 2018

Professional ratings
Review scores
Source	Rating
Exclaim!	8/10
Metal Hammer	3/5 stars
Metal Storm	5.5/10
My Global Mind	9/10 stars
Ultimate Guitar	8/10 stars

Big Tings is the seventh studio album from Welsh rock band Skindred. It was released on 27 April 2018.

== Track listing ==
All tracks are written by Skindred.

No.	Title	Length
1.	"Big Tings"	3:34
2.	"That's My Jam"	3:16
3.	"Machine" (featuring Gary Stringer of Reef)	3:32
4.	"Last Chance"	3:59
5.	"Tell Me"	4:41
6.	"Loud and Clear"	3:31
7.	"Alive"	3:21
8.	"All This Time"	3:02
9.	"Broken Glass"	3:53
10.	"Saying It Now"	4:35

Japanese Bonus Track
No.	Title	Length
11.	"Chase the Devil"	2:06

== Personnel ==
Skindred

- Benji Webbe – lead vocals, keyboards
- Daniel Pugsley – bass
- Mikey Demus – guitars, backing vocals
- Arya Goggin – drums

== Charts ==
Chart (2018)	Peak position
Scottish Albums (Official Charts)	36
UK Albums (Official Charts)	26
UK Independent Albums (Official Charts)	3
UK Rock & Metal Albums (Official Charts)	1
