= Smile (Skindred album) =

Studio album by Skindred
- Released: 4 August 2023
- Studio: VADA Recording Studios
- Genre: Alternative metal
- Length: 42:48
- Label: Earache
- Producer: Julian Emery

Skindred chronology
Big Tings (2018)	Smile (2023)	You Got This (2026)

Singles from Smile
- 1. "Gimme That Boom" Released: 8 November 2022; 2. "Set Fazers" Released: 22 March 2023; 3. "L.O.V.E. (Smile Please)" Released: 17 May 2023; 4. "Unstoppable" Released: 19 July 2023

Professional ratings
Review scores
Source	Rating
Angry Metal Guy	3/5
Blabbermouth.net	8/10
Distorted Sound	9/10
The Guardian	4/5 stars
Kerrang!	4/5
Laut.de	3/5 stars
Metal.de	8/10

Smile is the eighth studio album by Welsh rock band Skindred. It was released on 4 August 2023, through Earache. It is the last album to feature founding bassist Dan Pugsley, who left on 3 November 2025.

== Background ==
On 16 March 2021, the band signed a global four-album deal with the British label Earache Records. The first song to come out of the signing was the lead single "Gimme That Boom", released on 8 November 2022. A "hard-hitting" "ragga-metal" track, it describes lead singer Benji Webbe's encounter with a selfish fan.

The producing process was supported by Julian Emery and sound engineer Pete Hutchings, who had previously worked with Royal Blood and Florence and the Machine. The album also sees the celebration of their 25th band anniversary.

== Track listing ==
All tracks are written by Skindred.

Smile track listing
No.	Title	Length
1.	"Our Religion"	4:33
2.	"Gimme That Boom"	3:13
3.	"Set Fazers"	3:15
4.	"Life That's Free"	3:58
5.	"If I Could"	3:29
6.	"L.O.V.E. (Smile Please)"	3:08
7.	"This Appointed Love"	4:06
8.	"Black Stars"	4:00
9.	"State of the Union"	2:50
10.	"Addicted"	3:31
11.	"Mama"	3:36
12.	"Unstoppable"	3:03
Total length:		42:48

== Personnel ==
Skindred

- Arya Goggin - Drums
- Benji Webbe - Lead vocals
- Dan Pugsley - Bass
- Mikey Demus - Guitars, backing vocals

Production

- Julian Emery - Producer
- Pete Hutchings - Engineer, Mixer
- Sean Magee - Mastering
- Paul Meehan - Mixer of "L.O.V.E. (Smile Please)"
- George Perks - Additional engineer, mixer of "Unstoppable"
- Brian Rawling - Producer of "L.O.V.E. (Smile Please)"

== Charts ==
Chart performance for Smile
Chart (2023)	Peak position
German Albums (Offizielle Top 100)	73
Scottish Albums (Official Charts)	4
Swiss Albums (Schweizer Hitparade)	38
UK Albums (Official Charts)	2
UK Independent Albums (Official Charts)	1
UK Rock & Metal Albums (Official Charts)	1
US Top Current Album Sales (Billboard)	74
