= Elbriot =

Annual open air music festival in Hamburg, Germany

Coordinates: 53.54245°N 10.017231°E

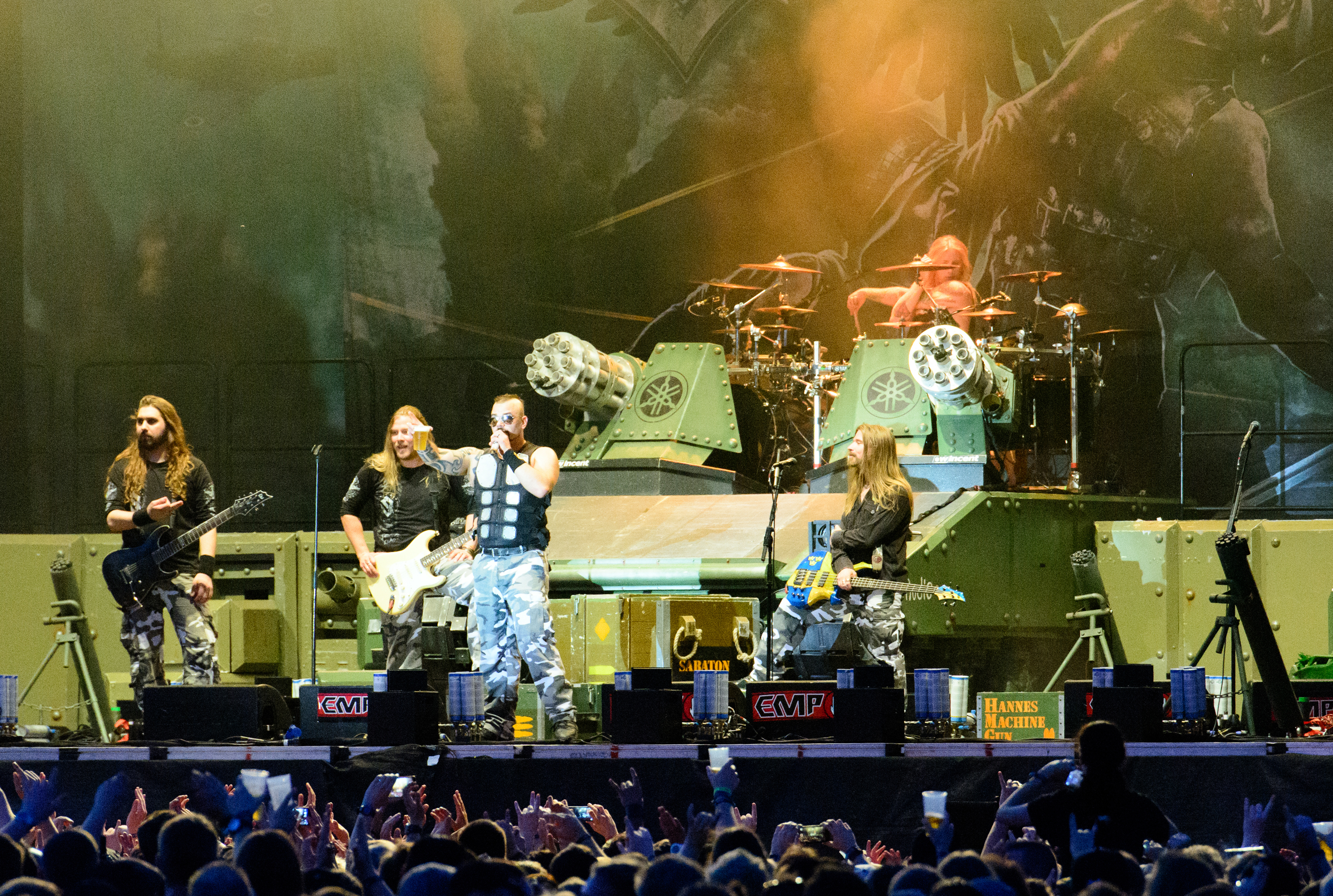
Sabaton from Sweden headlining the first day of 2016's Elbriot

Elbriot (Elbe riot) is an annual open air music festival in Hamburg, Germany, which features heavy metal and hardcore punk bands. It is organized by Hamburg Konzerte agency.

== History ==
The festival takes place on the compound of the Hamburg Wholesale Market. The first edition of the festival was sold out completely in a very short time with 14,000 tickets. It faced some organizational problems partly due to the high number of visitors, such as unnecessary barriers or lack of supply of drinks. In the subsequent years, a revised approach was introduced, such as a changed entrance situation and fewer barriers. The metal core band As I Lay Dying had to cancel their appearance in 2013, because their frontman Tim Lambesis was arrested shortly before. Caliban filled in during 2013, and Wovenwar, founded by three former members of As I Lay Dying, played in 2014. The second festival was overshadowed by cool temperatures, gusts of wind and some rain showers. Of Mice & Men had to cancel their appearance due to illness; Caliban played instead again. The third festival took place under extremely warm conditions, but there were no major injuries reported.

== Bands ==
- 2013: Anthrax, Betontod, Bullet for My Valentine, Caliban, Fear Factory, Killswitch Engage, Slayer, Trivium, Whitechapel
- 2014: A Day to Remember, Airbourne, Amon Amarth, August Burns Red, Caliban, Graveyard, Life of Agony, Machine Head, Wovenwar
- 2015: Black Stone Cherry, Blues Pills, Callejon, Enter Shikari, Eskimo Callboy, In Flames, Kreator, Kvelertak, Opeth, Vitja
- 2016: Asking Alexandria, At the Gates, Carcass, Fear Factory, Mastodon, Nasty, Paradise Lost, Powerwolf, Sabaton, Slayer, Steel Panther, Testament
- 2017: Architects, August Burns Red, Bullet for My Valentine, Bury Tomorrow, Children of Bodom, Hatebreed, Megadeth, Trivium, Whitechapel
- 2018: Arch Enemy, Beartooth, Jasta, Our Mirage, Skindred, Suicidal Tendencies, Satyricon, Uncured
- 2019: Airbourne, Dragonforce, Hatebreed, In Flames, Jinjer, Of Mice & Men, Shvpes, Zeal & Ardor
- 2020: cancelled
- 2021: cancelled
- 2022: Accept, Alestorm, Bullet for My Valentine, Caliban, Fever 333, Jinjer, Kissin’ Dynamite, Our Mirage
