= Kill the Power =

Studio album by Skindred
- Released: 27 January 2014
- Recorded: March–April 2013
- Studio: The Chairworks Studio, Leeds
- Genre: Alternative metal, reggae, electronic rock, nu metal
- Length: 48:35; 56:52 (deluxe edition)
- Label: BMG; Double Cross; Invise (Cooking Vinyl)
- Producer: James Loughrey

Skindred chronology
Union Black (2011)	Kill the Power (2014)	Volume (2015)

Singles from Kill the Power
- 1. "Ninja" Released: 2 September 2013; 2. "Kill the Power" Released: 24 November 2013; 3. "The Kids Are Right Now" Released: 11 June 2014

Professional ratings
Review scores
Source	Rating
The Guardian	3/5 stars
Jukebox:Metal	4/5 stars
Metal Hammer	4/5 stars
The Monolith	8.1/10 stars
Record Collector	3/5 stars

Kill the Power is the fifth studio album from Welsh rock band Skindred. It was announced on 29 April 2013, and was released on 27 January 2014. A Music video was released for "The Kids Are Right Now".

== Background ==
The album was announced by UK website Metal Hammer on 29 April 2013. On the subject, lead singer Benji Webbe said:

Kill The Power is our fifth studio album...We are more than excited to unleash this Skindred bomb on the world! Kill The Power is for all them that are sick of being the underdog, and wanna step up and destroy all those who oppress and hold them down! Use this album as a backdrop to overcome and take your life back! We ain’t fighting the power no more – we are definitely killing it!!

Dan Pugsley stated about the album title, "It’s more the idea that in life we have things that stand barriers, it might be a relationship or a habit and it's about facing those things, rather than it being purely political".

== Track listing ==
All tracks are written by Skindred, except where stated.

Kill the Power track listing
No.	Title	Writer(s)	Length
1.	"Kill the Power"		4:35
2.	"Ruling Force"		3:52
3.	"Playing with the Devil"		4:19
4.	"Worlds on Fire"		3:31
5.	"Ninja"		4:31
6.	"The Kids Are Right Now"		4:30
7.	"We Live"	Skindred, Russ Ballard	4:05
8.	"Open Eyed" (featuring Jenna G)	Skindred, Jenna G	4:42
9.	"Dollars and Dimes"		3:48
10.	"Saturday"	Skindred, Russ Ballard	3:59
11.	"Proceed with Caution"		3:18
12.	"More Fire"	Skindred, Russ Ballard	3:22
Total length:			48:35

Japanese bonus track
No.	Title	Length
13.	"Re-Education" (featuring MAH from SiM)	3:40
Total length:		52:15

iTunes bonus tracks
No.	Title	Length
13.	"Ghetto Long Time"	4:10
14.	"All Fall Down"	4:06
Total length:		56:52

== Personnel ==
Skindred

- Benji Webbe – vocals, synthesiser
- Daniel Pugsley – bass guitar
- Mikey Demus – guitar, backing vocals
- Arya Goggin – drums

Additional personnel

- James Loughrey – production, recording, mixing, programming
- Davide Venco – Recording engineer, mix engineer
- Cory Moore – assistant engineer
- Blair Goddard – assistant engineer
- Tim Fox – artwork
- Stronghold studios – pre-production

== Chart performance ==
Chart performance
Chart (2014)	Peak position
Scottish Albums (Official Charts)	53
UK Albums (Official Charts)	28
UK Independent Albums (Official Charts)	7
UK Rock & Metal Albums (Official Charts)	3
US Heatseekers Albums (Billboard)	17
