= Volume (album) =

Studio album by Skindred
- Released: 30 October 2015 (UK)
- Studio: Strongroom, London
- Genre: Alternative metal, reggae, nu metal
- Length: 43:10
- Label: Napalm
- Producer: James Loughrey

Skindred chronology
Kill The Power (2014)	Volume (2015)	Big Tings (2018)

Singles from Volume
- 1. "Under Attack" Released: 3 September 2015; 2. "Volume" Released: 14 October 2015

Volume is the sixth studio album from Welsh rock band Skindred. It was released on 30 October 2015.

== Reception ==
Professional ratings
Review scores
Source	Rating
AllMusic	3.5/5 stars
Distorted Sound	8/10
Kerrang!	4/5 Ks
Metal Hammer	3.5/5 stars

The album has been given particularly favourable reviews by critics, many of whom consider it more melodic in texture than prior albums.

The three interludes on the album were met with a generally more mixed reception; "I"'s use of air horns has been singled out in particular due to their obscurity in the genre.

== Track listing ==
All tracks are written by Skindred.

No.	Title	Length
1.	"Under Attack"	4:04
2.	"Volume"	3:37
3.	"Hit the Ground"	3:43
4.	"Shut Ya Mouth"	3:43
5.	"I"	0:47
6.	"The Healing"	4:01
7.	"Sound the Siren"	3:20
8.	"Saying It Now"	4:02
9.	"II"	0:48
10.	"Straight Jacket"	3:43
11.	"III"	0:52
12.	"No Justice"	2:44
13.	"Stand Up"	3:25
14.	"3 Words"	4:13
Total length:		43:10

Japanese edition bonus track
No.	Title	Length
15.	"Mercy"	2:55
Total length:		46:05

Expanded CD+DVD edition
No.	Title	Length
14.	"3 Words" (contains an untitled hidden track after 7 minutes of silence)	17:35
Total length:		61:35

== Personnel ==
Skindred

- Benji Webbe – vocals, synths
- Daniel Pugsley – bass
- Mikey Demus – guitar, backing vocals
- Arya Goggin – drums

== Chart performance ==
Chart performance
Chart (2015)	Peak position
Scottish Albums (Official Charts)	51
UK Albums (Official Charts)	29
UK Independent Albums (Official Charts)	5
UK Rock & Metal Albums (Official Charts)	2
US Heatseekers Albums (Billboard)	18
US Top Hard Rock Albums (Billboard)	22
