= Roots Rock Riot =

Studio album by Skindred
- Released: 23 October 2007
- Genres: Alternative metal; reggae; nu metal
- Length: 45:10
- Label: Bieler Bros.
- Producer: Matt Squire

Skindred chronology
Babylon (2002)	Roots Rock Riot (2007)	Shark Bites and Dog Fights (2009)

Alternative Cover
- Tour Edition

Singles from Roots Rock Riot
- 1. "Rat Race" Released: 23 September 2007; 2. "Trouble" Released: 31 October 2008

Professional ratings
Review scores
Source	Rating
AllMusic	4/5 stars
God Is in the TV	4/5
MetalSucks	3.5/5 horns

Roots Rock Riot is the second album by Welsh rock band Skindred. It was released on 23 October 2007 in the United States.

== Background ==
The album was produced by Matt Squire and mixed by Rick Will (who also mixed Skindred's debut album Babylon). The album sold 3,200 copies the first week of its release in the US.

== Track listing ==
1. "Roots Rock Riot" — 3:02
2. "Trouble" — 3:49
3. "Ratrace" — 3:22
4. "State of Emergency" — 4:03
5. "Alright" — 3:09
6. "Destroy the Dancefloor" — 3:44
7. "Rude Boy for Life" — 4:11
8. "Killing Me" — 4:19
9. "Spit Out the Poison" — 3:47
10. "Cause Ah Riot" — 3:05
11. "Ease Up" — 4:00
12. "Choices and Decisions" — 4:39

iTunes bonus track:
13. "Days Like These" — 3:42

Japanese bonus track:
14. "It's a Crime" — 3:18

== Personnel ==
Skindred

- Clive "Benji" Webbe – vocals
- Michael John "Mikeydemus" Fry – guitar
- Daniel Pugsley – bass, electronics
- Arya "Dirty Arya" Goggin – drums

Production

- Produced by Matt Squire
- Engineered by Jordan Schmidt and Matt LaPlant
- Mixed by Rick «Soldier» Will
- Mastered by Michael Fuller, at Fuller Sound, Miami, Florida
- Trumpet by Ryan Muir
- Trombone by Andrew Borstein
- Violin by Emilia Mettenbrink
- Viola by Chris Fischer
- Cello by Naomi Gray
- A&R by Jason and Aaron Bieler
- Art conception by Michael Fry
- Art direction and design by Tim Fox
- Photo by Jason Reposar

== Charts ==
Chart (2007)	Peak position
UK Rock & Metal Albums (Official Charts)	6
US Heatseekers Albums (Billboard)	6
US Independent Albums (Billboard)	22

2022 weekly chart performance
Chart (2021)	Peak position
UK Album Sales (OCC)	43
UK Independent Albums (Official Charts)	16
UK Physical Albums (OCC)	34
UK Record Store (OCC)	13
UK Vinyl Albums (OCC)	18
