= Carpe Diem (Will Haven album) =

Studio album by Will Haven
- Released: October 23, 2001
- Studio: The Hangar (Sacramento, CA); The Appliance Shop; Sound Arena (Van Nuys, CA)
- Genre: Sludge metal; noise rock; experimental rock
- Length: 46:08
- Label: Revelation; Music for Nations
- Producer: Eric Stenman

Will Haven chronology
WHVN (1999)	Carpe Diem (2001)	The Hierophant (2007)

Singles from Carpe Diem
- 1. "Carpe Diem" Released: 2002

Professional ratings
Review scores
Source	Rating
AllMusic	2.5/5 stars
Drowned in Sound	9/10
Metal Hammer	5/10
NME	8/10
Rock Sound	4/5 stars

Carpe Diem (Latin pronunciation: [ˈkarpe ˈdiem]; Latin aphorism, usually translated "seize the day") is the third studio album by noise metal band Will Haven. It was released on October 23, 2001 via Revelation Records/Music for Nations. Recording sessions took place at The Hangar in Sacramento, The Appliance Shop in Los Angeles and Sound Arena in Van Nuys. Production was handled by Eric Stenman.

The album only managed to peak at number 24 on the UK Rock & Metal Albums and number 31 on the UK Independent Albums, while its single of the same name reached number 17 on the UK Rock & Metal Singles Chart.

== Track listing ==
No.	Title	Length
1.	"S.H.R"	1:08
2.	"Saga"	4:10
3.	"Carpe Diem"	3:46
4.	"Bats"	7:26
5.	"Dressed in Night Clothes"	3:38
6.	"Dolph Lundgren"	3:20
7.	"Finest Our"	4:45
8.	"Alpha Male"	4:23
9.	"Miguel Encontro la Fe Otra Vez"	4:35
10.	"Moving to Montana"	8:57
Total length:		46:08

Notes

- Track 10 includes a hidden track at 6:15 after 20-second silence.

== Personnel ==
- Grady Avenell – vocals
- Jeff Irwin – guitar, piano
- Mike Martin – bass
- Mitch Wheeler – drums
- Eric Stenman – producer, engineering
- Jeff Swisley – design
- Tom D. Kline – layout

== Charts ==
Chart (2001)	Peak position
UK Rock & Metal Albums (OCC)	24
UK Independent Albums (OCC)	31
