= Skindred =

Welsh metal band

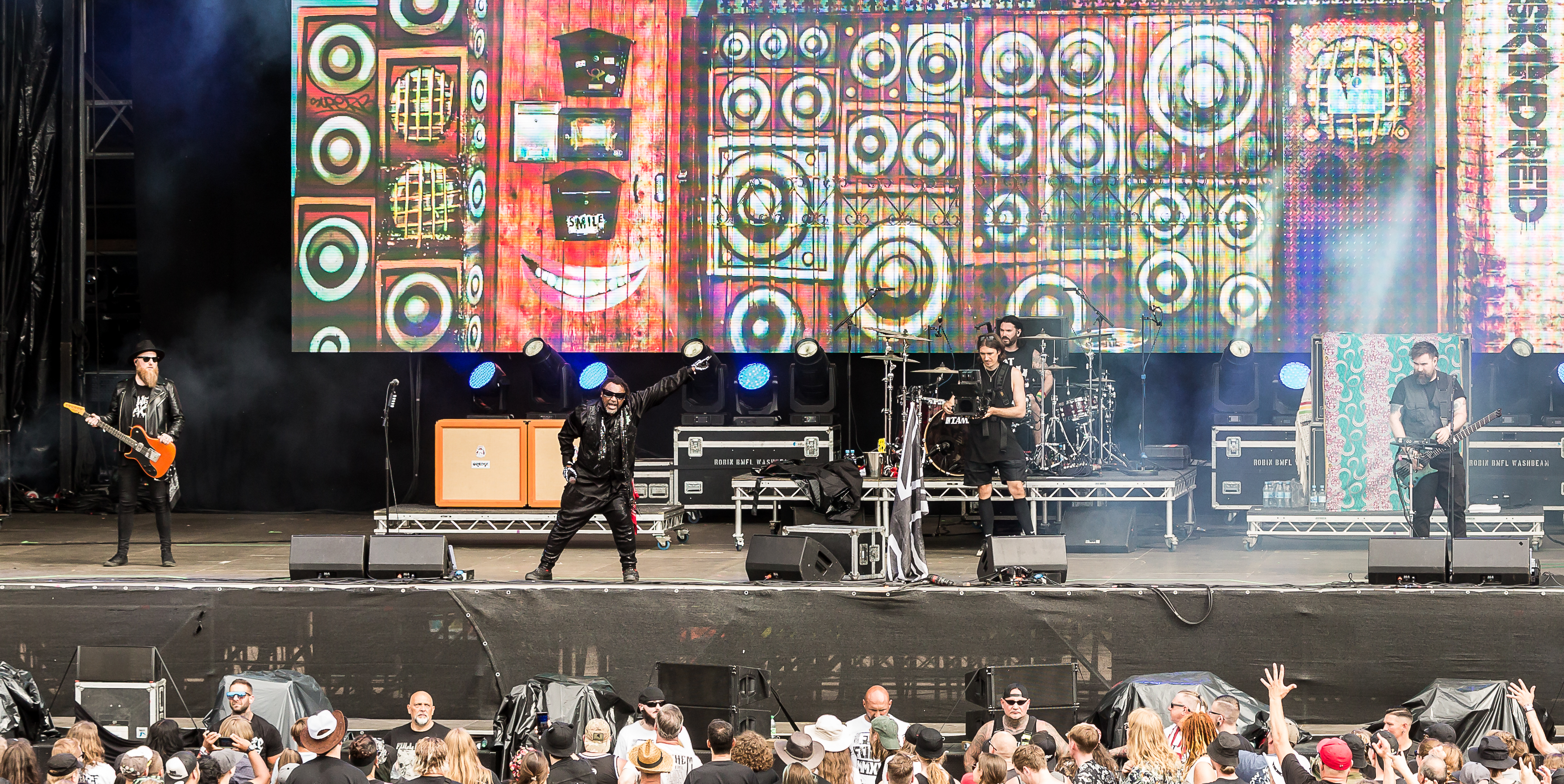
- Skindred performing at Full Force 2023

Background information
- Origin: Newport, Wales
- Genres: Alternative metal; reggae rock; rap metal; nu metal
- Years active: 1998–present
- Labels: Earache; Napalm; BMG; Warner Bros.; MCA; Bieler Bros.; Lava; Atlantic; DoubleCross
- Spinoff of: Dub War
- Members: Benji Webbe; Mikey Demus; Arya Goggin
- Past members: Daniel Pugsley; Jeff Rose; Martyn "Ginge" Ford; Dan Sturgess
- Website: skindred.net

Skindred is a Welsh rock band that fuses heavy metal with other genres, most notably reggae. Formed in Newport in 1998, they are well known for their energetic and involving live performances and have won several awards including "Best Live Band" at the 2011 UK Metal Hammer Golden Gods Awards and the "Devotion Award" at the 2011 Kerrang! Awards. In 2026, the band's ninth album You Got This became their first album to top the UK Albums Chart.

== History ==
=== Dub War and beginning (1993–2001) ===
Dub War was formed in Newport, Wales in 1993 and eventually signed with Earache Records, releasing two full-length studio albums on the label during that decade: Pain and Wrong Side Of Beautiful (the band later released Westgate Under Fire in 2022). Pain hit #1 in the UK Independent Album chart. Dub War’s metal crossover sound set the template for which lead vocalist Benji Webbe and his band mates in Skindred would later adopt and perfect.

Originally, Webbe started his career in music with a group of friends that filmed a music video to go along with a song named "Point of No Return" that was sung on location in Newport in 1990, alongside, Que, John Friendly and Steven Draycott. Benji tried to form a band out of the people featured in the video (that was going to be called Bancall) however the name was changed to Dub War. The band thereafter disbanded in 1999 due to disputes with the label, which have since been rectified.

=== Babylon (2002–2006) ===
Webbe later formed Skindred with bassist Daniel Pugsley, guitarist Mikey Demus and drummer Arya Goggin after Webbe was unable to put together a new project featuring other members of Dub War. In 2002, Skindred released its debut album, Babylon. After being reissued in 2003 by RCA Records, the album was re-released by Lava Records on 14 August 2004. AllMusic writer Johnny Loftus wrote that "Skindred doesn't seem to consciously want the reinvention tag; it has simply tapped into the same lack of pretension that fueled Korn and Living Colour's Vivid – records that were made visionary by an unadulterated honesty in both delivery and craft. [...] highly recommended for fans of literate genre jumpers like Soulfly and System of a Down, or any heshers looking for some heavy-hitting firepower that hasn't fallen victim to the anvil of corporate assimilation."

In the United States, Babylon charted at No. 1 on the Billboard Top Reggae Albums chart, No. 5 on the Top Heatseekers chart and at No. 189 on the Billboard 200, and the single "Nobody" peaked at No. 14 on the Mainstream Rock Tracks chart and at No. 23 on the Modern Rock Tracks chart in 2004. In 2005, the single "Pressure" peaked at No. 30 on the Hot Mainstream Rock Tracks chart. In 2006, Babylon once again charted at No. 1 on the Top Reggae Albums chart.

=== Roots Rock Riot and Shark Bites and Dog Fights (2006–2010) ===
Throughout the year 2006, the band was writing material for their second album (it was initially set for a fall 2006 release). The band re-entered the studio in early 2007 to record songs for the album. On 23 October 2007, Skindred released its second album, Roots Rock Riot on Bieler Bros. Records. In the United States, the album peaked at No. 6 on the Top Heatseekers chart and at No. 22 on the Top Independent Albums chart. The album Shark Bites and Dog Fights was released in September 2009.

=== Union Black (2011–2012) ===
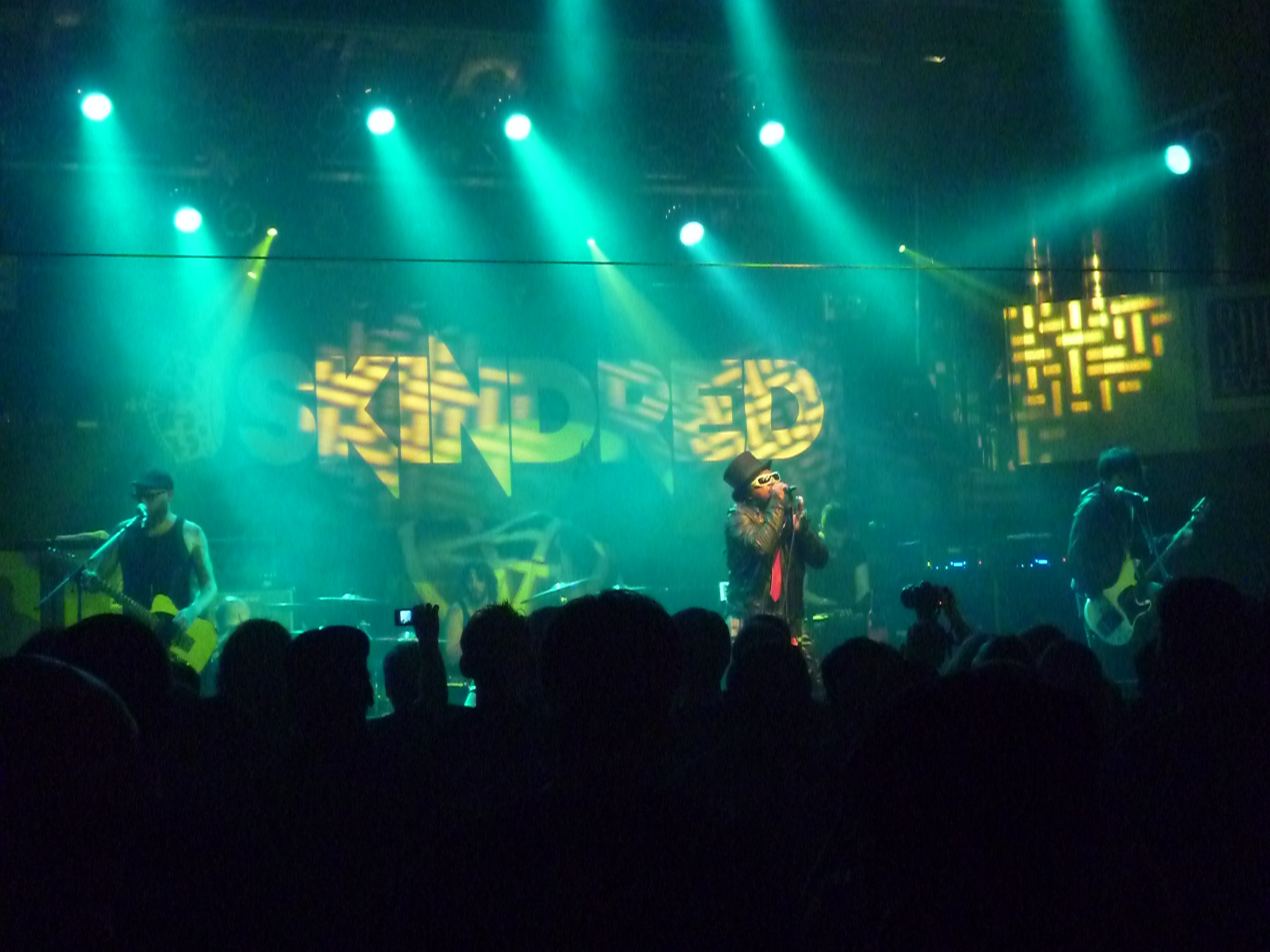
Skindred performing in Germany, 2011

In 2011, Dan Sturgess was added to Skindred's live lineup. The band's fourth studio album, Union Black, was released 25 April 2011 exclusively to the UK and Europe. On 1 July, it was released in Germany, Austria and Switzerland. The band promoted this with a UK tour, supported by American post-hardcore group Chiodos and Blackpool band Me Vs Hero. The London show was filmed for Scuzz TV in the UK. Skindred also played at several major European festivals including Download Festival on the Acoustic Stage (Friday) and Main Stage (Saturday), Boardmasters Festival, Wacken Open Air, Przystanek Woodstock and Sonisphere Festival in Spain and Switzerland, the Swiss leg of Sonisphere being notable for the first live performance of Warning with Jacoby Shaddix, whose band Papa Roach was also performing at Sonisphere in Switzerland.

=== Kill the Power (2013–2014) ===
In March 2013, the band posted a studio walkthrough of The Chairworks Studio in Castleford, announcing their work on their fifth album. In April, they officially announced the title for their new album to be Kill the Power. The album was then released on 24 January 2014. It debuted on the iTunes chart at No. 37 and then climbed to No. 32 where it peaked.

=== Volume (2015–2016) ===
Between their fifth and sixth albums, Skindred left their label BMG and signed with Napalm Records. On 30 October 2015, the band released the album Volume, marking the shortest amount of time between albums. Alongside the standard release, a deluxe edition of the album that contained a documentary called "Rude Boys for Life" was available for pre-order through PledgeMusic. The documentary looks at life on the road, its ups and downs, celebrations, festival appearances and headline shows, studio access, and the band's Polish Woodstock headline show where they played to over 1 million people. The album debuted on the iTunes chart at No. 55 where it peaked.

=== Big Tings (2017–2020) ===
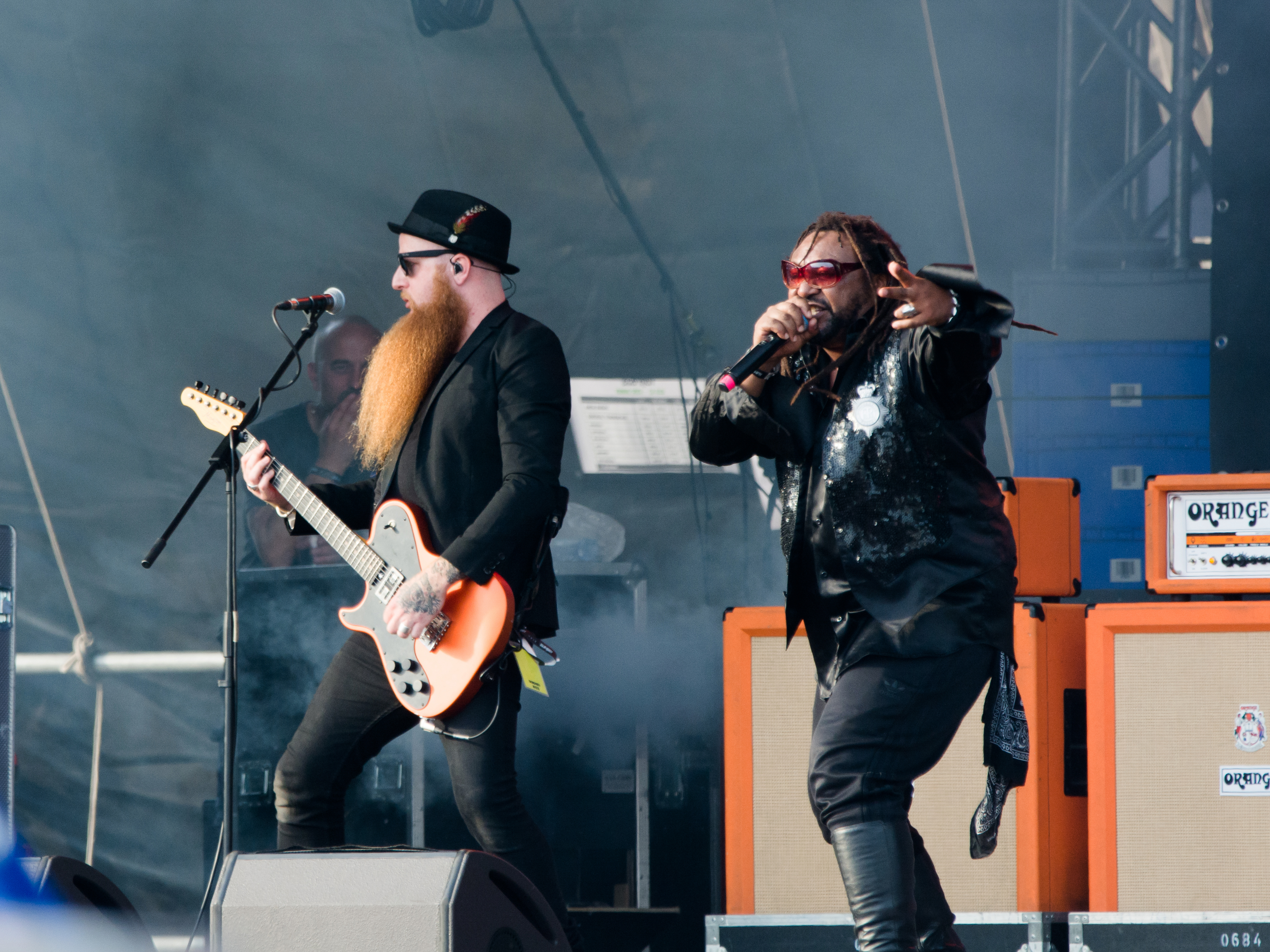
Skindred at Elbriot 2018

Their seventh album, Big Tings, followed in 2018 and was released on 27 April. In between touring Big Tings, writing began on their eighth album Smile.

=== Smile and You Got This (2021–present) ===
In March 2021, it was announced that Skindred had signed a new global record deal with Earache Records. August 2023 saw the band fight a closely contested chart race for the UK Number 1 Album spot with their eighth album Smile. With the incredible support of the rock and metal community – including messages of support from Metallica, Rage Against The Machine and Disturbed as well as Kerrang!, NME and Louder publications – the band landed a career best of Number 2 in the UK Album chart, leading to a feature on BBC Breakfast.

Smile also topped the UK Rock and Metal Albums, UK Independent Albums, UK Vinyl Albums, and UK Album Downloads charts.

All of this followed announcing their biggest ever headline show at Wembley Arena for March 2024 and selling out multiple shows for their October 2023 Smile headline tour months in advance, to winning Best UK Live Act at the Heavy Music Awards 2023 and being the cover stars of Kerrang! magazine for the first time. The band's 00s hit “Nobody” also saw a resurgence following a viral TikTok dance trend in February 2023.

At the end of 2025, long-time bassist Dan Pugsley left the band after 27 years. He was replaced by Tommy Gleeson, former touring guitarist with Feeder, as a touring member.

In April 2026, the band released their ninth album You Got This, which became their first album to top the UK Albums Chart.

== Musical style ==
Skindred fuse heavy metal, reggae, punk, hip hop and electronica influences to create a unique style and sound. The band has previously referred to this style as "ragga metal". Benji Webbe has also jokingly referred to the band's musical style as "nu-reggae", in reference to the term nu metal. Although Skindred has sometimes been compared to Bad Brains, Webbe states that "To someone who doesn't know anything about reggae music, of course we're going to sound like Bad Brains. It's like someone who doesn't know anything about opera might say that Pavarotti sounds just like Mario Lanza. But when your ears are trained and you know what you're looking for, you're going to say, 'Shit no, Mario Lanza don't sound nothing like Pavarotti.'"

== Band members ==
Band members at Metal Frenzy Open Air 2026

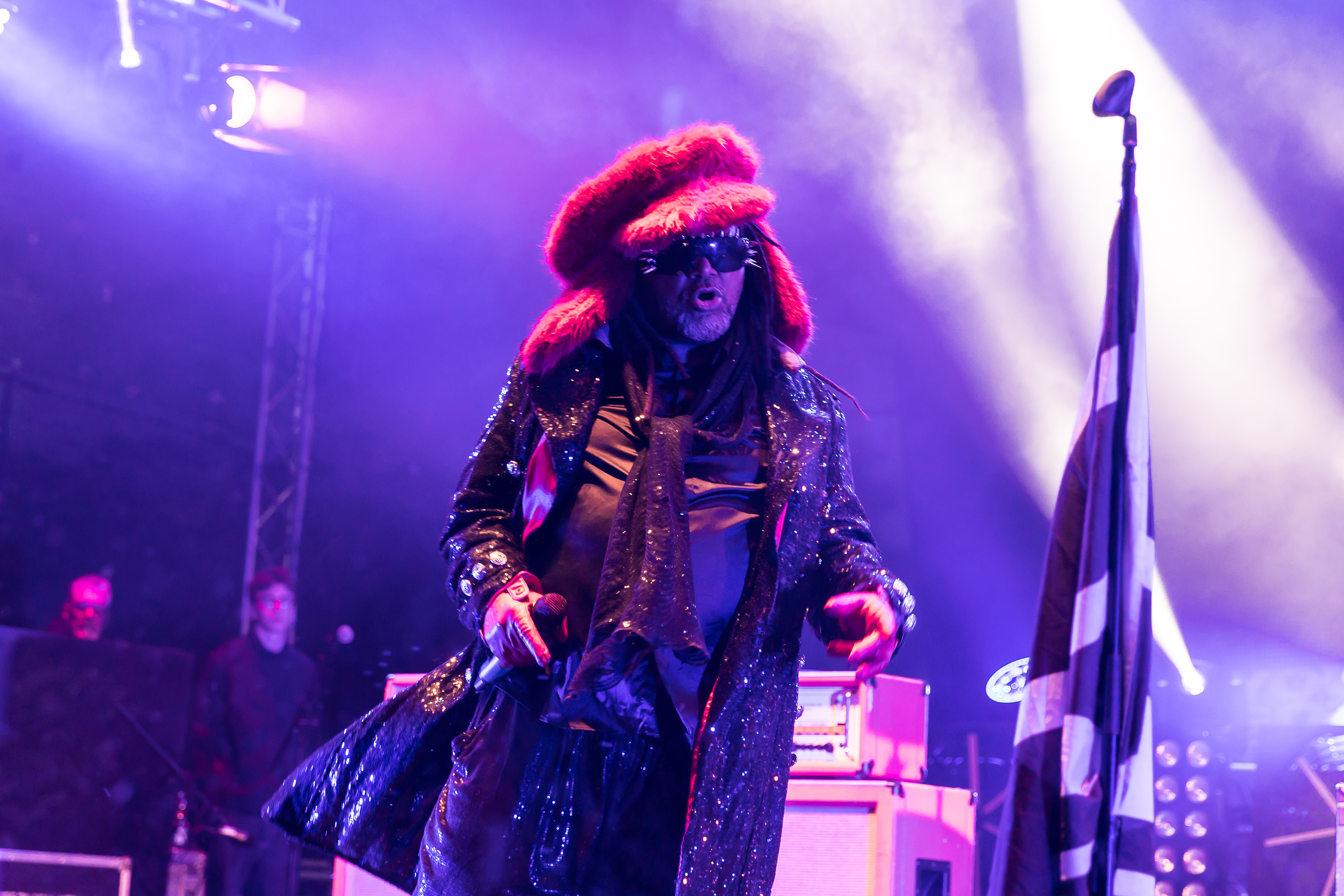
Benji Webbe, vocals

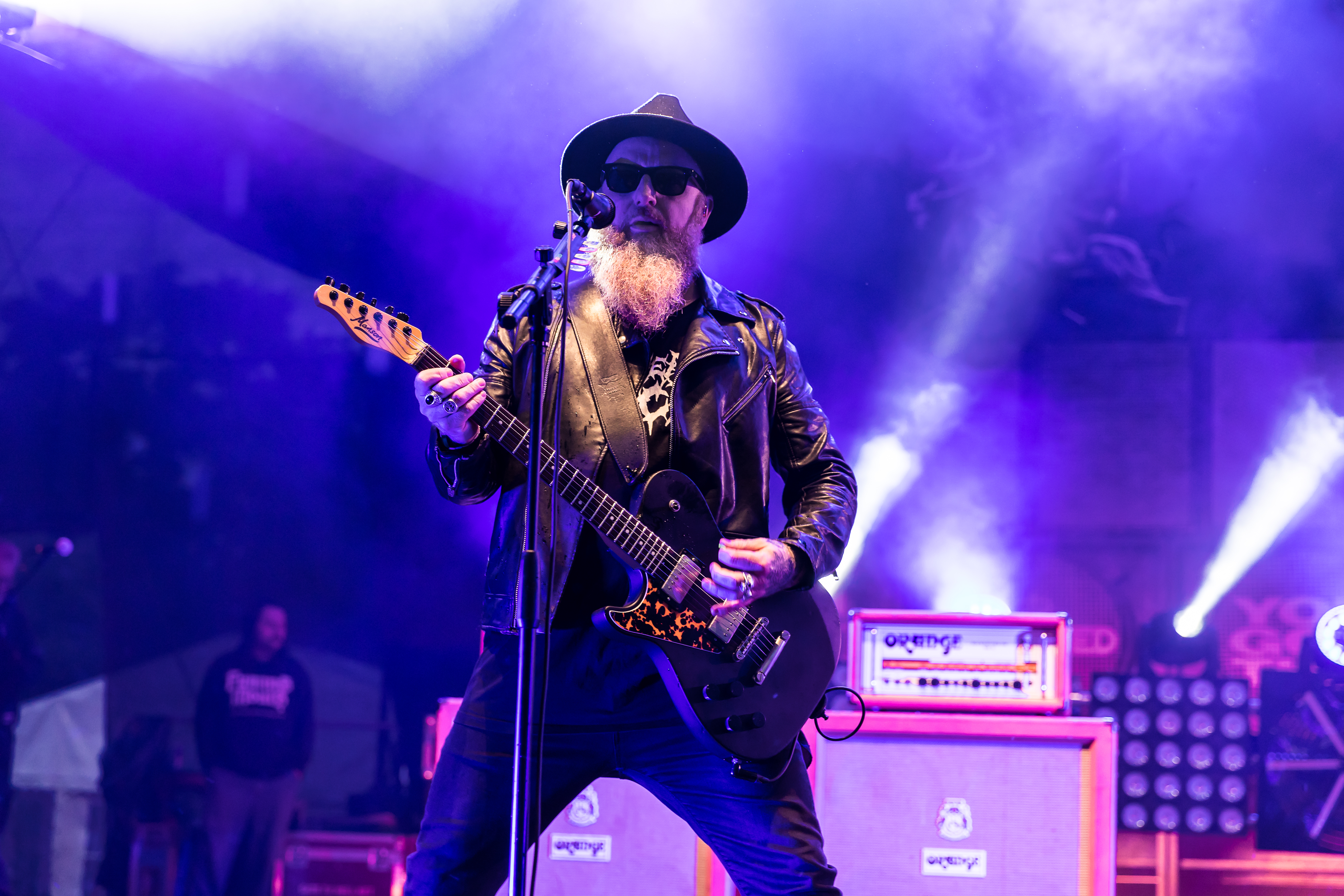
Mikey Demus, guitars

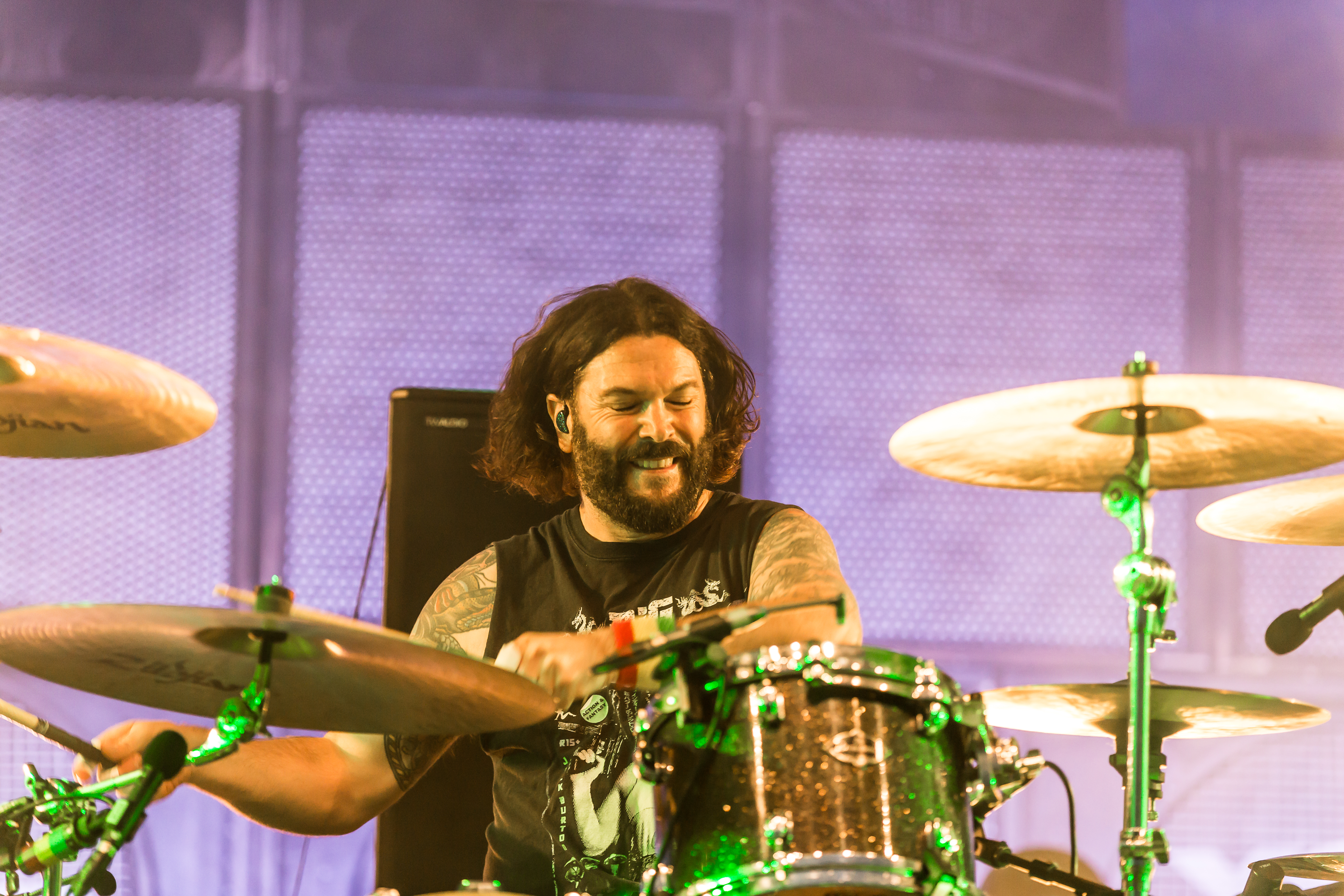
Arya Goggin, drums

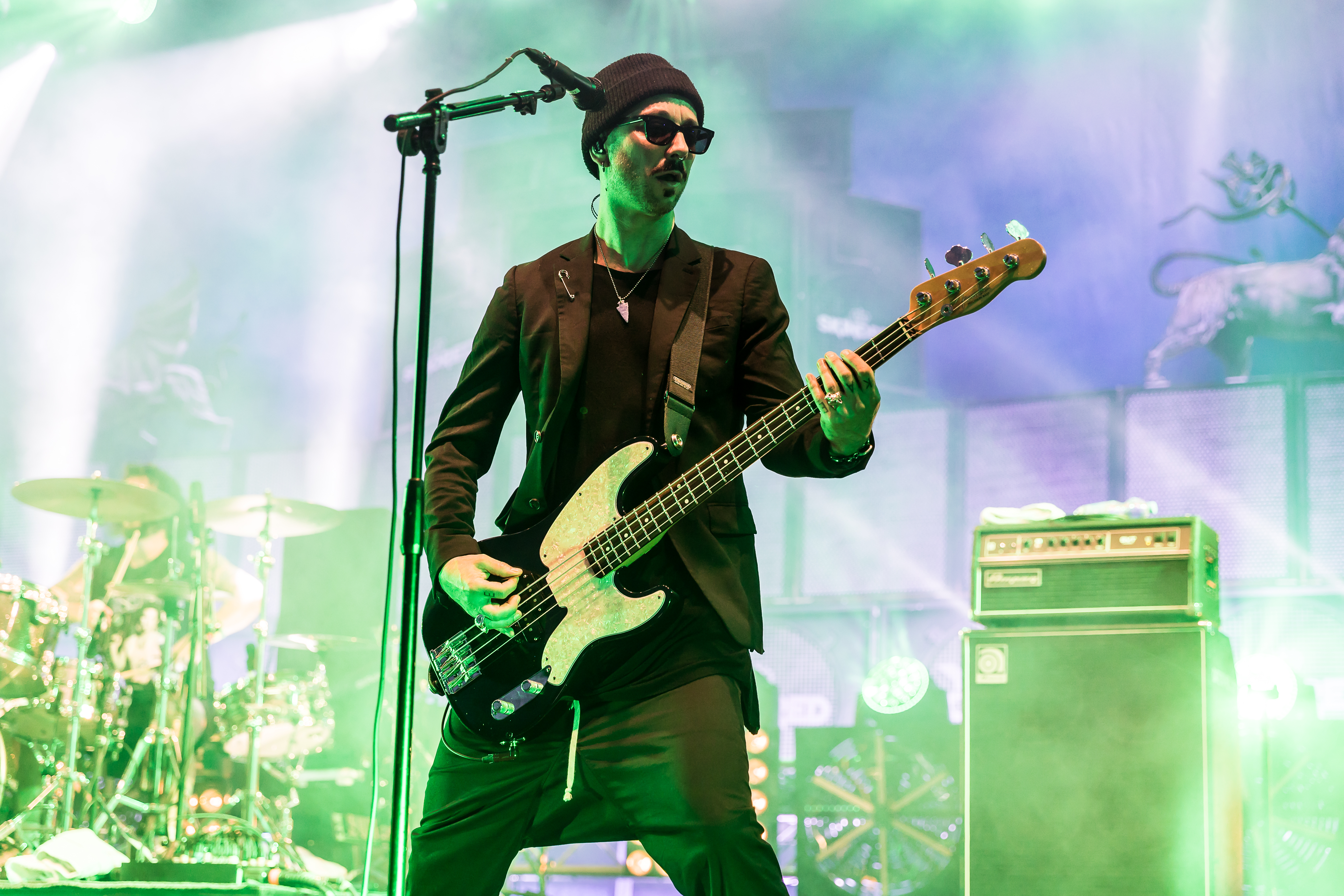
Tommy Gleeson, bass

Current members

- Benji Webbe – lead vocals (1998–present), synthesizers (2011–present)
- Mikey Demus – guitars, backing vocals (2002–present)
- Arya Goggin – drums (2002–present)

Touring members

- Tommy Gleeson – bass guitar (2025–present)

Former members

- Daniel Pugsley – bass, programming, synthesizers, backing vocals (1998–2025)
- Jeff "Death" Rose – guitars (2001–2002)
- Martyn "Ginge" Ford – drums (2001–2002)
- Dan "Brixton" "Sanchez" Sturgess – DJ, programming, backing vocals (2011–2017)

== Discography ==
- Babylon (2002)
- Roots Rock Riot (2007)
- Shark Bites and Dog Fights (2009)
- Union Black (2011)
- Kill the Power (2014)
- Volume (2015)
- Big Tings (2018)
- Smile (2023)
- You Got This (2026)

== Appearances ==
=== Television ===
- Fuse TV 'Daily Download' (4 November 2004)
- Late Night with Conan O'Brien (14 December 2004)
- Later... with Jools Holland (21 October 2023)

Skindred's bassist Daniel Pugsley played for the gypsy punk band Gogol Bordello for their appearance on Later... with Jools Holland on 16 June 2006.

Video game

The song "Nobody" was used in the games Need For Speed Underground 2 and MX vs. ATV Unleashed.

Skindred’s music has been used twice in the video game Blitz The League and its PSP counterpart Blitz: Overtime.

=== Music festivals ===
Skindred has appeared at a multitude of international music festivals. Notable appearances include the band's 2011 appearance at Download Festival, where the 'Newport Helicopter' was born. Skindred also made headlines at the same festival in 2006 when Benji Webbe took part performing Korn's track A.D.I.D.A.S. onstage at Download Festival with the band, after vocalist Jonathan Davis was unexpectedly rushed to hospital.

Skindred's festival appearances have included:

- Download Festival – Donington Park, England (2006, 2008, 2011, 2012, 2014, 2016, 2019, 2022, 2023, 2026)
- Getaway Festival, Sweden (2012, 2014)
- Graspop Metal Meeting, Dessel, Belgium (2008, 2016, 2018)
- Hammerfest – Prestatyn, Wales (2009, 2010, 2012)
- Hegyalja Festival, Hungary (2012, 2013)
- Hellfest, Clisson, France (2013, 2019, 2025)
- Highfield Festival, Leipzig, Germany (2005, 2011, 2013)
- Hurricane Festival, Bremen, Germany (2010, 2014)
- Merthyr Rock Festival, Merthyr Tydfil, Wales (2011, 2012)
- Nova Rock Festival, Nickelsdorf, Austria (2010, 2016)
- Pukkelpop Festival, Hasselt, Belgium (2010, 2012)
- Reading and Leeds Festival, England (2013, 2016, 2018)
- Reload Festival, Sulingen, Germany (2011, 2013)
- Resurrection Fest, Spain (2015, 2016)
- Sonisphere Festival – Knebworth House, England (2009, 2010)
- Wacken Open Air Festival, Wacken, Germany (2011, 2018)
- With Full Force Festival, Germany (2010, 2011, 2023)
- Summer Sonic Festival – Osaka & Tokyo, Japan (2008)
- Freeze Festival, London, England (2010)
- Gurten Festival, Bern, Switzerland (2010)
- Lowlands Festival, Netherlands, (2010)
- Ozzfest UK – The O2 Arena, London, England (2010)
- Rock for People Festival, Czech Republic (2010)
- Sziget Festival, Budapest, Hungary (2010)
- Bingley Music Live, England (2011)
- Woodstock Festival Poland, Kostrzyn nad Odrą, Poland (2011)
- Exit Festival, Novi Sad, Serbia (2012)
- Hard Rock Calling Festival, Hyde Park, London, England (2012)
- No Blur Circuit Festival Shibuya, Tokyo, Japan (2012)
- Rock al Parque Festival – Bogotá, Colombia (2012)
- Sonisphere Festival Madrid, Spain (2012)
- South By Southwest (SXSW) Festival, Austin, Texas, United States (2012)
- Kubana Festival, Krasnodar, Russia (2013)
- Mighty Sounds Festival, Czech Republic (2013)
- NH7 Weekender, Pune, India (2013)
- Rock'n Coke Festival, Istanbul, Turkey (2013)
- Serengeti Festival, Germany (2013)
- Frequency Festival, Austria (2014)
- Woodstock Festival Poland, Kostrzyn nad Odrą, Poland (2014)
- Redfest Festival Redhill, Surrey, England (2014)
- Rock on the Range, Columbus, Ohio, United States (2014)
- Soundwave, Australia (2014)
- Bråvalla Festival, Sweden (2015, 2017)
- Festival Au fil du son, France (2016)
- Boomtown, Winchester, Hampshire, England (2017, 2023)
- Bloodstock Open Air, Burton upon trent, England (2017, 2021)
- Download Festival – Madrid, Spain (2017)
- Faine Misto festival Festival, Ukraine (2017)
- Steelhouse Festival, Wales, (2017)
- Hammerfest Hafan Y Mor, Wales, (2018)
- Copenhell, Copenhagen, Denmark (2019)
- Beautiful days (Festival) Escot Park (2021) (2023)
- Kendal Calling Lowther Deer Park (2025)
- Metal Frenzy Open Air, Gardelegen, Germany (2026)
- Summer Breeze Open Air, Germany (2026)

=== Tours ===
- European tour with Adema and SOiL (2002)
- European tour supporting P.O.D., with Ill Niño (2002)
- European tour with Voodoo Glow Skulls (2003)
- US tour with Nonpoint (2004)
- US tours with Sevendust (2004, 2005)
- US tour with Breaking Benjamin (2004)
- US arena tour with Korn, Chevelle, Breaking Benjamin and Instruction (2004)
- US headlining tour with Fivespeed supporting (2005)
- Warped Tour, USA & Canada (2005)
- UK tour with Reel Big Fish & The Matches 2005
- US tour with HIM and Finch (2005)
- US Tour with Papa Roach (2005)
- UK headlining tour with Dub Trio (2006)
- US tour 'The Great American Rampage Tour' with Nonpoint, Ankla & Karnivool (2007)
- US, UK & Euro tours with Gogol Bordello (2008)
- Eastpak Antidote Tour with Flogging Molly (2008)
- US, UK & Euro 'Shark Bites and Dog Fights' headline tour (2009)
- US & Canadian tours with Disturbed (2009)
- UK tour with Rob Zombie (2011)
- UK 'Union Black' headline tour with Chiodos & Me Vs Hero (2011)
- Soundwave 'Counter Revolution' tour with Hollywood Undead, Australia (2011)
- Jägermeister Music Tour (UK) with Therapy? & Black Spiders (2012)
- Redline Tour in Japan, with SiM (2013)
- UK & European Kill The Power headline tour with SOiL 2014
- UK & European Tour with Steel Panther (2015)
- US headlining tour 'Pump Up The Volume' with (hed)p.e. and Media Solution (2016)
- Australian Tour with Max & Iggor Cavalera (Roots 20th Anniversary Tour 2017)
- UK headlining tour 'Start the Machine' with Danko Jones and CKY (2018)
- UK & European Tour with Disturbed (2019)
- Live at "The Roundhouse" Camden London (This will be recorded Live and released as their very 1st Live Album) (21 November 2020)

== Awards and nominations ==
Kerrang! Awards

Year	Recipient	Award	Result
2010	Skindred	Best Live Band	Nominated
2011	Skindred	Devotion Award	Won

Metal Hammer Golden Gods Awards

Year	Recipient	Award	Result
2011	Skindred	Best Live Band	Won

Heavy Music Awards

Year	Recipient	Award	Result
2023	Skindred	Best UK Live Act	Won

MOBO Awards

Year	Recipient	Award	Result
2023	Skindred	Best Alternative Music Act	Won
