= Bieler Bros. Records =

American independent record label

- Founded: 2002
- Founder: Aaron Bieler, Jason Bieler
- Distributor: Alternative Distribution Alliance
- Genre: Hard rock; alternative metal; alternative rock; punk rock
- Country of origin: U.S.
- Location: Florida
- Official website: www.bielerbros.com

Bieler Bros. Records is an independent record label in Florida.

== History ==
Bieler Bros. Records was formed in January 2002 by brothers Aaron and Jason Bieler. The label was aligned with MCA Records before becoming independent.

== Distribution ==
Distribution in the United States is handled by Alternative Distribution Alliance (a subsidiary of Warner Music Group). Bieler Bros. also have offices located in the United Kingdom, and have distribution for Canada through eOne Music Canada, Germany, Austria and Switzerland.

== Label roster ==
=== Current artists ===
- Ankla
- Another Black Day
- A Silent Film
- City of God
- Censura!
- Deathstars
- diRTy WoRMz
- Esoterica
- Fiction Plane
- In Whispers
- Into The Presence
- Look Right Penny
- Mobile
- Raintime
- Stam1na
- Stereoside
- Tetanus
- Uncrowned
- Wide Eye Panic
- Will Haven

=== Previous artists ===
- Bomb Factory
- Burn Season
- Egypt Central
- Fiction Plane
- Nonpoint
- SikTh
- Skindred
- Slaves on Dope
- Smile Empty Soul
- SOiL
- Sunset Black

== See also ==
- List of record labels
