= 15x(5+U) Live at Yokohama Arena =

Live album / DVD by Coldrain
- Released: 17 May 2023
- Recorded: 16 October 2022
- Venue: Yokohama Arena (Yokohama, Japan)
- Genre: Post-hardcore; metalcore; alternative metal; alternative rock; hard rock; electronic rock
- Length: 117:05
- Label: Warner Music Japan
- Producer: Inni Vision

Coldrain chronology
Nonnegative (2022)	15x(5+U) Live at Yokohama Arena (2023)	Final Destination (XV Re:Recorded) (2024)

Singles from 15x(5+U) Live at Yokohama Arena
- 1. "Calling" Released: 10 February 2023; 2. "Before I Go" Released: 10 May 2023

15x(5+U) Live at Yokohama Arena is the fifth live album by Japanese rock band Coldrain. Recorded during the band's inaugural show at Yokohama Arena on 16 October 2022, it was produced by Inni Vision and released on 17 May 2023.

On 26 January 2024, the live album became the first by the band to be released on digital platforms.

== Background ==
On 2 February 2020, the band announced they would be performing a One Man Show at Yokohama Arena, one of the world's largest indoor arenas for the first time ever, on 18 October of the same year. However, due to the arising COVID-19 pandemic, the concert was cancelled on 4 September 2020. The band later announced a rescheduled date for the venue as the penultimate final show on the band's fifteenth-anniversary tour during the touring cycle for their newly announced seventh studio album Nonnegative.

On 2 February 2023, the band announced that their performance at Yokohama Arena would be released as their fifth live DVD album, entitled 15x(5+U) Live at Yokohama Arena, scheduled for its initial release on 19 April 2023. An official live music video for "Calling" as a promotional single was released alongside the announcement. However, due to issues of failing to acquire the licensing rights to include their cover of No Doubt's "Don't Speak" in the release, the band were forced to cut the performance of the song and also postpone and delay its release to 17 May 2023. The band later released an official live music video of "Before I Go" as the second and final promotional single from the performance on 10 May 2023.

The live album for 15x(5+U) Live at Yokohama Arena also includes bonus content of an audio commentary of the performance and interviews and behind-the-scenes footage of the band's headlining Nonnegative Japanese tour.

== Track listing ==
All lyrics are written by Masato Hayakawa; all music is composed by Coldrain.

15x(5+U) Live at Yokohama Arena track listing
No.	Title	Original album	Length
1.	"Help Me Help You"	Nonnegative	4:30
2.	"Calling"	Nonnegative	4:12
3.	"2020"	Nonnegative	4:09
4.	"The Revelation"	The Revelation	4:12
5.	"Envy"	Fateless	4:28
6.	"Cut Me"	Nonnegative	3:52
7.	"Vena"	Vena	1:03
8.	"Fire in the Sky"	Vena	3:37
9.	"Given Up on You"	The Revelation	3:27
10.	"Rabbit Hole"	Nonnegative	4:07
11.	"Counterfeits & Lies"	Final Destination	3:50
12.	"Boys and Girls"	Nonnegative	4:11
13.	"Heart of the Young"	Vena	4:48
14.	"The Side Effects"	The Side Effects	3:52
15.	"No Escape"	Through Clarity	3:11
16.	"Evolve"	Until the End	3:45
17.	"F.T.T.T"	Fateless	4:13
18.	"Miss You"	Nothing Lasts Forever	4:34
19.	"Bloody Power Fame"	Nonnegative	4:10
20.	"Here with You"	Nonnegative	3:48
21.	"Enemy Medley" ("To Be Alive"/"New Fate"/"Rescue Me"/"Adrenaline")	The Enemy Inside	6:14
22.	"The Maze" (featuring Mah of SiM)	The Enemy Inside	4:54
23.	"Revolution"	The Side Effects	4:33
24.	"Paradise (Kill the Silence)"	Nonnegative	4:46
25.	"From Today"	Nonnegative	4:38
26.	"See You"	The Side Effects	4:18
27.	"Before I Go"	Nonnegative	4:49
28.	"Final Destination"	Final Destination	4:54
Total length:			117:05

== Personnel ==
Coldrain

- Masato David Hayakawa (マサト, Masato) – lead vocals, production
- Ryo Yokochi (ヨコチ, Y.K.C.) – lead guitar, programming, keyboards
- Kazuya Sugiyama (スギ, Sugi) – rhythm guitar, backing vocals
- Ryo Shimizu (リョウ, RxYxO) – bass, backing vocals
- Katsuma Minatani (カツマ, Katsuma) – drums, percussion

== Charts ==
Chart performance for 15x(5+U) Live at Yokohama Arena
Chart (2023)	Peak position
Japanese DVD Albums (Oricon)	11
Japanese Music DVD Albums (Oricon)	10
Japanese Blu-ray Albums (Oricon)	16
Japanese Music Blu-ray Albums (Oricon)	10

== Release history ==
Release history and formats for 15x(5+U) Live at Yokohama Arena
Region	Date	Format	Label	Ref.
Japan	17 May 2023	DVD; Blu-ray	Warner Music Japan	
Various	26 January 2024	Digital download; streaming	Warner Music Japan	
