= 20180206 Live at Budokan =

Live album / DVD by Coldrain
- Released: September 26, 2018
- Recorded: February 6, 2018, Nippon Budokan of Chiyoda, Tokyo
- Venue: Nippon Budokan
- Genres: Post-hardcore; metalcore; alternative metal; alternative rock; punk rock; hard rock; screamo
- Length: 2:15:48
- Label: Warner Music Japan
- Producer: Inni Vision

Coldrain chronology
Fateless (2017)	20180206 Live at Budokan (2018)	The Side Effects (2019)

20180206 Live at Budokan is the third live DVD by Japanese rock band Coldrain, released on September 26, 2018. The end credits of the DVD/Blu-ray is the song "My Addiction" from the first studio album Final Destination.

The entirety of Fateless is played in full with the exception of "Aftermath", which was not selected for unknown reasons.

Due to the COVID-19 pandemic, Coldrain announced that they would showcase the entire performance on YouTube to help entertain everyone while in quarantine.

== Track listing ==
"20180206 Live at Budokan" was released in CD, DVD and Blu-ray formats.

=== DVD and Blu-ray ===
All lyrics are written by Masato Hayakawa; all music is composed by Coldrain.

No.	Title	Original album	Length
1.	"Envy"	Fateless	4:07
2.	"Feed The Fire"	Fateless	3:47
3.	"Wrong"	Vena	4:15
4.	"Fire in the Sky"	Vena	4:20
5.	"Inside Out"	Fateless	3:56
6.	"Lost in Faith"	Fateless	5:42
7.	"No Escape"	Through Clarity	3:13
8.	"To Be Alive"	The Enemy Inside	3:21
9.	"Six Feet Under"	Through Clarity	5:18
10.	"Bury Me"	Fateless	3:58
11.	"Colorblind"	Fateless	5:53
12.	"Stay"	Fateless	3:47
13.	"Uninvited"	Fateless	4:52
14.	"Runaway"	Vena	4:20
15.	"24-7"	Final Destination	3:43
16.	"Die Tomorrow"	Nothing Lasts Forever	6:33
17.	"Confession"	The Enemy Inside	5:19
18.	"The Story" (Acoustic)	Vena	6:03
19.	"Gone"	Vena	4:30
20.	"R.I.P."	Fateless	5:26
21.	"Fiction"	Final Destination	3:46
22.	"Adrenaline"	The Enemy Inside	3:41
23.	"F.T.T.T."	Fateless	4:18
24.	"Final Destination"	Final Destination	6:34
25.	"A Decade in the Rain"	Fateless	6:41
26.	"The War is On"	The Revelation	3:48
27.	"Aware and Awake"	The Revelation	5:28
28.	"The Revelation"	The Revelation	4:21
Total length:			2:15:48

=== CD 1 ===
No.	Title	Length
1.	"Envy"
2.	"Feed the Fire"
3.	"Wrong"
4.	"Fire in the Sky"
5.	"Inside Out"
6.	"Lost in Faith"
7.	"No Escape"
8.	"To Be Alive"
9.	"Six Feet Under"
10.	"Bury Me"
11.	"Colorblind"
12.	"Stay"
13.	"Uninvited"
14.	"Runaway"
15.	"24-7"
16.	"Die Tomorrow"

=== CD 2 ===
No.	Title	Length
1.	"Confession"
2.	"The Story" (Acoustic)
3.	"Gone"
4.	"R.I.P."
5.	"Fiction"
6.	"Adrenaline"
7.	"F.T.T.T."
8.	"Final Destination"
9.	"A Decade in the Rain"
10.	"The War is On"
11.	"Aware and Awake"
12.	"The Revelation"

== Personnel ==
- Masato David Hayakawa (マサト, Masato) – lead vocals
- Ryo Yokochi (ヨコチ, Y.K.C.) – lead guitar, programming, keyboards
- Kazuya Sugiyama (スギ, Sugi) – rhythm guitar, guitar, backing vocals
- Ryo Shimizu (リョウ, RxYxO) – bass guitar, backing vocals
- Katsuma Minatani (カツマ, Katsuma) – drums, percussion

== Charts ==
Chart (2018)	Peak position
Japanese Albums (Oricon)	9
