= Live & Backstage at Blare Fest. 2020 =

Live album / DVD by Coldrain
- Released: October 28, 2020
- Recorded: February 1 & 2, 2020
- Venue: Port Messe (Nagoya, Japan)
- Genre: Post-hardcore; metalcore; alternative metal; alternative rock; hard rock; nu metal
- Length: 66:17 (Day 1); 51:29 (Day 2)
- Label: Warner Music Japan
- Producer: Jiei Mogi

Coldrain chronology
The Side Effects (2019)	Live & Backstage at Blare Fest. 2020 (2020)	Paradise (Kill the Silence) (2021)

Live & Backstage at Blare Fest. 2020 is the fourth live album by Japanese rock band Coldrain. Recorded at Port Messe in Nagoya, Japan on February 1 & 2, 2020, it was produced by Jiei Mogi and was released on October 28, 2020.

== Background ==
On 4 November 2019, it was announced that the annually held concert "Blaredown Barriers" hosted by the band would be converted into a festival for the first time in its history. Renaming the event to be called "Blare Fest" in the process, as well as announcing the first set of bands to play the festival such as Crossfaith, Crystal Lake, SiM, The Word Alive and Fever 333.

As the weeks would go on, they would announce other bands such as One OK Rock, Man with a Mission, Volumes, Crown the Empire and We Came as Romans.

Barely a month after Blare Fest concluded, the arising COVID-19 pandemic forced the majority of countries to lockdown, including Japan. This would halt any plans the band had for the rest of the year, who were forced into postponing or cancelling all concerts. This would end up including their one man live show at the world renowned Yokohama Arena, which along with the cancellation announcement on 4 September 2020, they announced the DVD/Blu-ray live album for Live & Backstage at Blare Fest. 2020.

== Track listing ==
Live & Backstage at Blare Fest. 2020 was released in DVD and Blu-ray formats.

=== Day 1 ===
All lyrics are written by Masato Hayakawa; all music is composed by Coldrain.

No.	Title	Original album	Length
1.	"Revolution"	The Side Effects	3:43
2.	"Envy"	Fateless	4:02
3.	"The Side Effects"	The Side Effects	4:10
4.	"Fire in the Sky"	Vena	7:49
5.	"Persona"	Through Clarity	3:29
6.	"F.T.T.T"	Fateless	4:54
7.	"January 1st"	The Side Effects	9:06
8.	"The Story"	Vena	5:18
9.	"Mayday" (featuring Ryo Kinoshita of Crystal Lake)	The Side Effects	4:39
10.	"24-7" (featuring Mah of SiM)	Final Destination	5:31
11.	"The Revelation" (featuring Kenta Koie of Crossfaith and Mitsu, Kana and Ikawaken of HEY-SMITH)	The Revelation	13:31
Total length:			66:17

=== Day 2 ===
No.	Title	Original album	Length
1.	"The Revelation"	The Revelation	4:37
2.	"Feed the Fire"	Fateless	3:55
3.	"To Be Alive"	The Enemy Inside	3:35
4.	"Coexist"	The Side Effects	4:23
5.	"F.T.T.T"	Fateless	8:38
6.	"Envy"	Fateless	4:05
7.	"No Escape"	Through Clarity	3:25
8.	"See You"	The Side Effects	5:15
9.	"Revolution"	The Side Effects	6:56
10.	"Final Destination"	Final Destination	6:35
Total length:			51:29

== Personnel ==
Coldrain

- Masato David Hayakawa (マサト, Masato) – lead vocals, production
- Ryo Yokochi (ヨコチ, Y.K.C.) – lead guitar, programming, keyboards
- Kazuya Sugiyama (スギ, Sugi) – rhythm guitar, guitar, backing vocals
- Ryo Shimizu (リョウ, RxYxO) – bass guitar, backing vocals
- Katsuma Minatani (カツマ, Katsuma) – drums, percussion

== Charts ==
Chart performance for Live & Backstage at Blare Fest. 2020
Chart (2020)	Peak positions
Japanese DVD Albums (Oricon)	6
Japanese Music DVD Albums (Oricon)	3
Japanese Blu-ray Albums (Oricon)	20
