= Fateless (album) =

Studio album by Coldrain
- Released: October 11, 2017
- Recorded: May 2017
- Studios: Studio Barbarosa (Orlando, Florida, US)
- Genres: Post-hardcore; metalcore; alternative metal; alternative rock; hard rock
- Length: 46:04
- Label: Warner Music Japan
- Producer: Michael Baskette

Coldrain chronology
| Vena II (2016) | Fateless (2017) | 20180206 Live at Budokan (2018) |

Singles from Fateless
- 1. "Envy" Released: August 8, 2017; 2. "Feed the Fire" Released: September 21, 2017; 3. "R.I.P." Released: October 14, 2017

Fateless (stylised in all caps) is the fifth studio album by Japanese rock band Coldrain. Recorded at Studio Barbarosa in Orlando, Florida with producer Michael "Elvis" Baskette, it was released on October 11, 2017 by Warner Music.

Fateless is the first Coldrain album to be released under the label of Warner Music Japan, following leaving Hopeless Records towards the backend of 2016, and also the first to not be released under the Japanese label VAP. This would be the follow-up since 2015's Vena, and be their second highest charting album on the Oricon Albums Chart, debuting and peaking at number 8, only behind The Revelation which peaked at number 7.

The album was home to three singles, "Envy", the lead single, which was released in the beginning of August, "Feed The Fire", on the 21st of the following month, as well as being the opening theme of the anime King's Game, and "R.I.P." in October, just three days after the release of Fateless. Coldrain would also ambitiously cover "Uninvited" by Alanis Morissette on this 12 track record that runs a little over 46 minutes.

== Composition ==
The band's 2017 studio album Fateless has been described by critics as post-hardcore, metalcore, alternative metal, alternative rock, and hard rock.

== Track listing ==
All lyrics written by Masato Hayakawa, all music composed by Masato Hayakawa and Ryo Yokochi, except where noted.

Fateless track listing
| No. | Title | Writer(s) | Length |
|---|---|---|---|
| 1. | "Envy" | | 3:51 |
| 2. | "Feed the Fire" | | 3:56 |
| 3. | "Lost in Faith" | | 3:26 |
| 4. | "Bury Me" | | 3:54 |
| 5. | "R.I.P." | | 4:02 |
| 6. | "Inside Out" | | 3:32 |
| 7. | "Stay" | | 3:41 |
| 8. | "Colorblind" | | 3:37 |
| 9. | "F.T.T.T" (For the Thousandth Time) | | 3:34 |
| 10. | "Uninvited" (Alanis Morissette cover) | Alanis Morissette | 4:31 |
| 11. | "Aftermath" | | 3:51 |
| 12. | "A Decade in the Rain" | | 4:09 |
| Total length: | | | 46:04 |

10 Year Anniversary Limited Edition
| No. | Title | Original album | Length |
|---|---|---|---|
| 1. | "To Be Alive" | The Enemy Inside |
| 2. | "Rescue Me" | The Enemy Inside |
| 3. | "My Addiction" | Final Destination |
| 4. | "After Dark" | Nothing Lasts Forever |
| 5. | "Miss You" | Nothing Lasts Forever |
| 6. | "Fiction" | Final Destination |
| 7. | "Final Destination" | Final Destination |
| 8. | "Evolve" | Until the End |
| 9. | "Runaway" | Vena |
| 10. | "Fade Away" | Until the End |
| 11. | "Persona" | Through Clarity |
| 12. | "Six Feet Under" | Through Clarity |
| 13. | "Whole" | Vena |
| 14. | "Gone" | Vena |
| 15. | "Fire in the Sky" | Vena |
| 16. | "Carry On" | The Revelation |
| 17. | "The Revelation" | The Revelation |

== Personnel ==
Credits retrieved from album's liner notes.

Coldrain

- Masato David Hayakawa (マサト, Masato) – lead vocals
- Ryo Yokochi (ヨコチ, Y.K.C.) – lead guitar, programming, keyboards, synthesizers
- Kazuya Sugiyama (スギ, Sugi) – rhythm guitar, guitar, backing vocals
- Ryo Shimizu (リョウ, RxYxO) – bass guitar, backing vocals
- Katsuma Minatani (カツマ, Katsuma) – drums, percussion

Additional personnel

- Michael Baskette – producer, mixing, arrangement
- Ted Jensen – mastering (Sterling Sound, NYC)
- Jeff Moll – recording engineer
- Kevin Thomas – assistant engineer

== Charts ==
Chart performance for Fateless
| Chart (2017) | Peak position |
|---|---|
| Japanese Albums (Oricon) | 8 |
| Japanese Albums (Billboard) | 8 |
