= Three Days of Adrenaline =

2011 live rock DVD by Coldrain

Live album / DVD by Coldrain
- Released: December 7, 2011
- Genre: Post-hardcore; alternative rock
- Length: 85:58
- Label: VAP
- Producer: Inni Vision

Coldrain chronology
The Enemy Inside (2011)	Three Days of Adrenaline (2011)	Through Clarity (2012)

Three Days of Adrenaline is the first live DVD by Japanese rock band Coldrain, released on December 7, 2011.

Three Days of Adrenaline was recorded in three cities: Osaka, Nagoya, and Tokyo. The track list contains all the songs of the album The Enemy Inside and some songs from Final Destination and Nothing Lasts Forever. The DVD has a special feature of Mah from the ska punk band SiM.

Due to the COVID-19 pandemic, many of Coldrain's gigs were forced to be postponed or cancelled. To entertain fans during the lockdown period, they released Three Days of Arenaline for free on YouTube for a limited time.

== Track listing ==
All lyrics are written by Masato Hayakawa; all music is composed by Coldrain

No.	Title	Original album	Length
1.	"Intro"		2:05
2.	"To Be Alive"	The Enemy Inside	3:17
3.	"New Fate"	The Enemy Inside	3:18
4.	"Adrenaline"	The Enemy Inside	3:40
5.	"The Youth"	Nothing Lasts Forever	3:31
6.	"Rise and Fall"	The Enemy Inside	3:48
7.	"Die Tomorrow"	Nothing Lasts Forever	3:10
8.	"Doors"	Final Destination	3:00
9.	"After Dark"	Nothing Lasts Forever	3:49
10.	"Confession"	The Enemy Inside	4:21
11.	"8AM"	Final Destination	4:01
12.	"You"	The Enemy Inside	4:54
13.	"Fiction"	Final Destination	3:32
14.	"24-7"	Final Destination	3:23
15.	"Hollow"	The Enemy Inside	4:34
16.	"A Tragic Instinct"	The Enemy Inside	4:30
17.	"Rescue Me"	The Enemy Inside	3:39
18.	"The Maze" (ft. Mah)	The Enemy Inside	4:42
19.	"Final Destination"	Final Destination	8:10

Extra features

No.	Title	Length
24.	"We're Not Alone" (Encore)	3:58
25.	"The Maze" (Osaka Too Close Extreme One Cut Ver.)	4:13
26.	"Painting & My Addiction" (Tokyo Exclusive Performance)	9:03
27.	"Miss You" (Tokyo Exclusive Performance)	4:06
28.	"To Be Alive" (Music Video)	4:07
29.	"To Be Alive" (Trailer)	1:00
30.	"Rescue Me" (Music Video)	3:34
31.	"Rescue Me" (Trailer)	0:32

== Personnel ==
- Masato David Hayakawa (マサト, Masato) – lead vocals
- Ryo Yokochi (ヨコチ, Y.K.C.) – lead guitar
- Kazuya Sugiyama (スギ, Sugi) – rhythm guitar, backing vocals
- Ryo Shimizu (リョウ, RxYxO) – bass guitar, backing vocals
- Katsuma Minatani (カツマ, Katsuma) – drums

== Charts ==
Chart (2011)	Peak position
Japanese Albums (Oricon)	31
