= Evolve (Coldrain album) =

Live album / DVD by Coldrain
- Released: April 30, 2014
- Recorded: January 18, 2014, Studio coast of Shin-kiba, Tokyo
- Genre: Post-hardcore; metalcore; screamo; alternative rock
- Label: VAP
- Producer: Inni Vision

Coldrain chronology
| The Revelation (2013) | Evolve (2014) | Until the End (2014) |

Evolve is the second live DVD by Japanese rock band Coldrain, which was released on April 30, 2014.

The Blu-ray contains the making of the album The Revelation. The end credits of the DVD/Blu-ray is the song "Believe" from the second maxi-single "8AM".

Due to the COVID-19 pandemic, many of Coldrain's gigs were forced to be postponed or cancelled. To entertain fans during the lockdown period, they released Evolve for free on YouTube for a limited amount of time.

== Track listing ==
"Evolve" was released in CD, DVD and Blu-ray formats.

=== CD ===
| No. | Title | Length |
|---|---|---|
| 1. | "Behind the Curtain" |
| 2. | "Time Bomb" |
| 3. | "Rescue Me" |
| 4. | "Die Tomorrow" |
| 5. | "Given Up on You" |
| 6. | "No Escape" |
| 7. | "Voiceless" |
| 8. | "Confession" |
| 9. | "Next to You" |
| 10. | "24-7" |
| 11. | "Six Feet Under" |
| 12. | "The War Is On" |
| 13. | "To Be Alive" |
| 14. | "The Revelation" |

=== DVD and Blu-Ray ===
| No. | Title | Length |
|---|---|---|
| 1. | "Behind the Curtain" |
| 2. | "Time Bomb" |
| 3. | "Rescue Me" |
| 4. | "Die Tomorrow" |
| 5. | "Persona" |
| 6. | "Given Up on You" |
| 7. | "No Escape" |
| 8. | "Voiceless" |
| 9. | "We're Not Alone" |
| 10. | "Confession" |
| 11. | "Next to You" |
| 12. | "Never Look Away" |
| 13. | "24-7" |
| 14. | "Six Feet Under" |
| 15. | "Miss You" |
| 16. | "Carry On" |
| 17. | "The War Is On" |
| 18. | "Inside of Me" |
| 19. | "To Be Alive" |
| 20. | "The Maze" |
| 21. | "The Revelation" |
| 22. | "Fiction" |
| 23. | "Adrenaline" |
| 24. | "Final Destination" |

Blu-ray extra features

| No. | Title | Length |
|---|---|---|
| 25. | "The Making of the New Record: Episode 1" |
| 26. | "The Making of the New Record: Episode 2" |

== Personnel ==
- Masato David Hayakawa (マサト, Masato) – lead vocals
- Ryo Yokochi (ヨコチ, Y.K.C.) – lead guitar
- Kazuya Sugiyama (スギ, Sugi) – rhythm guitar, backing vocals
- Ryo Shimizu (リョウ, RxYxO) – bass guitar, backing vocals
- Katsuma Minatani (カツマ, Katsuma) – drums

== Charts ==
| Chart (2014) | Peak position |
|---|---|
| Japanese Albums (Oricon) | 12 |
