= Calling (Coldrain song) =

2022 single by Coldrain

Single by Coldrain

from the album Nonnegative
- Released: 17 April 2022
- Recorded: February 2022
- Studio: Studio Barbarosa (Orlando, Florida, U.S.)
- Genre: Nu metal; metalcore; hard rock
- Length: 3:27
- Label: Warner Music Japan
- Songwriters: Masato Hayakawa; Ryo Yokochi
- Producer: Michael Baskette

Coldrain singles chronology
| "Paradise (Kill the Silence)" (2021) | "Calling" (2022) | "Before I Go" (2022) |

Music video
- "Calling" on YouTube

"Calling" is a song by Japanese rock band Coldrain. It was released as the second single from the band's seventh studio album Nonnegative, written by frontman Masato Hayakawa and lead guitarist Ryo Yokochi, and produced by Michael Baskette. It was released on 17 April 2022 to coincide with the band's fifteenth anniversary.

== Background ==
On 16 April 2022, the band held a live stream on their YouTube channel to celebrate their fifteenth anniversary as a band. During the livestream, the band's seventh studio album Nonnegative was announced alongside the second single "Calling" which was then released subsequently released at midnight on 17 April 2022 half an hour later to coincide with the band's fifteenth anniversary. They later debuted the song for the first time live at Viva La Rock in Saitama at the Saitama Super Arena.

== Composition and lyrics ==
"Calling" has been described by critics as a nu metal, metalcore, and a hard rock song. The song runs at 120 BPM and is in the key of A major. It was written by frontman Masato Hayakawa and lead guitarist Ryo Yokochi and produced by Michael Baskette, and runs for three minutes and 27 seconds. The song was written about the band's journey and their connection with the fanbase throughout their career to commemorate their fifteenth anniversary as a band. Morecore described the song as "emotional and powerful."

Speaking to V13.net, Hayakawa elaborated on his thoughts about "Calling":

"Heavy riffs and screaming rap-like vocals. The song screamed ‘roots’ so I made it about us. Fifteen years in a band. It’s a statement that we’re not going anywhere."

== Track listing ==
| No. | Title | Lyrics | Music | Length |
|---|---|---|---|---|
| 1. | "Calling" | Masato Hayakawa | Ryo Yokochi; Hayakawa | 3:27 |

== Music video ==
The official music video for "Calling" was released on 17 April 2022 and was directed by Koh Yamada.

The video starts with the band getting out of a van and making their way through a warehouse where the band make t-shirt prints filled with the song's lyrics in a studio room. This is accompanied by visual references to the band's fifteenth anniversary while also showcasing archival footage of old studio recording sessions and live shows the band has performed throughout their career, including their performance at Blare Fest intertwined with the band performing "Calling" in the abandoned warehouse.

== Personnel ==
Credits adapted from Tidal.

Coldrain

- Masato Hayakawa – lead vocals, lyrics, composition, arrangements
- Ryo Yokochi – lead guitar, programming, composition, arrangements
- Kazuya Sugiyama – rhythm guitar, arrangements
- Ryo Shimizu – bass guitar, arrangements
- Katsuma Minatani – drums, arrangements

Additional personnel

- Michael Baskette – producer, mixing, arrangements
- Brad Blackwood — mastering
- Jef Moll — recording engineer
- Joshua Saldate – assistant engineer

== Charts ==
Chart performance for "Calling"
| Chart (2022) | Peak position |
|---|---|
| Germany Rock Airplay (GfK) | 7 |
| Japan Digital Rock (iTunes) | 70 |
| Taiwan Rock Airplay (Billboard) | 58 |
