= Before I Go (Coldrain song) =

2021 song by Coldrain

Single by Coldrain

from the album Nonnegative
- Released: 8 June 2022
- Recorded: January – March 2022
- Studio: Studio Barbarosa (Orlando, Florida, U.S.)
- Genre: Post-hardcore; metalcore; hard rock; alternative rock
- Length: 4:06
- Label: Warner Music
- Songwriters: Masato Hayakawa; Ryo Yokochi
- Producer: Michael Baskette

Coldrain singles chronology
"Calling" (2022)	"Before I Go" (2022)	"Bloody Power Fame" (2022)

Music video
- "Before I Go" on YouTube

"Before I Go" is a song by Japanese rock band Coldrain. Written by frontman Masato Hayakawa and lead guitarist Ryo Yokochi, and produced by Michael Baskette, it was released as the third single from the band's seventh studio album Nonnegative, on 8 June 2022.

On 10 May 2023, the band released an official live music video for "Before I Go" from their performance at Yokohama Arena on 16 October 2022. It was released as part of the promotion for their fifth live video album 15x(5+U) Live at Yokohama Arena.

== Background ==
On 6 June 2022 the band first teased "Before I Go" on their social media platforms as part of Sapporo Breweries' latest product Saporro Beer Gold Star promotional campaign, of which a teaser including the song for the advert was made available on YouTube as well as Japanese television. The band later released the song alongside its accompanying music video two days later on 8 June. The band starred on the cover for Spotify's "Big in Japan" playlist which featured "Before I Go" to promote the newly released single on the platform.

== Composition and lyrics ==
"Before I Go" has been described by critics as a post-hardcore, metalcore, hard rock, and an alternative rock song. The song runs at 170 BPM and is in the key of A major. It was written by frontman Masato Hayakawa and lead guitarist Ryo Yokochi and produced by Michael Baskette, and runs for four minutes and 6 seconds. Paul Brown of Wall of Sound noted that the song had an "uptempo drum beat that’ll have you bouncing around the room in no time", while George Knight of Thunderchord pointed out that the verses were almost "dance rock like in terms of grooviness."

Speaking to V13.net, Hayakawa explained the meaning of "Before I Go":

"A song that shows who we are as a band. There’s no gimmicks. We love things straight forward and we love being a band playing rock music. Sometimes you just have to put that statement out there."

== Track listing ==
No.	Title	Lyrics	Music	Length
1.	"Before I Go"	Masato Hayakawa	Ryo Yokochi; Hayakawa	4:06

== Music video ==
The official music video for "Before I Go" was released on 8 June 2022 and was directed by Inni Vision.

The video features the band performing the song on the cliff-face of a quarry with a full set of studio lights. They perform the song during the day and transition to them performing during the nighttime towards the end of the song where they release a bunch of pyrotechnics into the sky surrounding the set to culminate the climax of the song as it ends.

== Personnel ==
Credits adapted from Tidal.

Coldrain

- Masato Hayakawa – lead vocals, lyrics, composition, arrangements
- Ryo Yokochi – lead guitar, programming, composition, arrangements
- Kazuya Sugiyama – rhythm guitar, arrangements
- Ryo Shimizu – bass guitar, arrangements
- Katsuma Minatani – drums, arrangements

Additional personnel

- Michael Baskette – producer, mixing, arrangements
- Brad Blackwood – mastering
- Jef Moll – recording engineer
- Joshua Saldate – assistant engineer

== Charts ==
=== Weekly charts ===
Weekly chart performance for "Before I Go"
Chart (2022)	Peak position
Germany Rock Airplay (GfK)	2

=== Year-end charts ===
Year-end chart performance for "Before I Go"
Chart (2022)	Position
Germany Rock Airplay (GfK)	39
