= Coldrain =

Japanese rock band

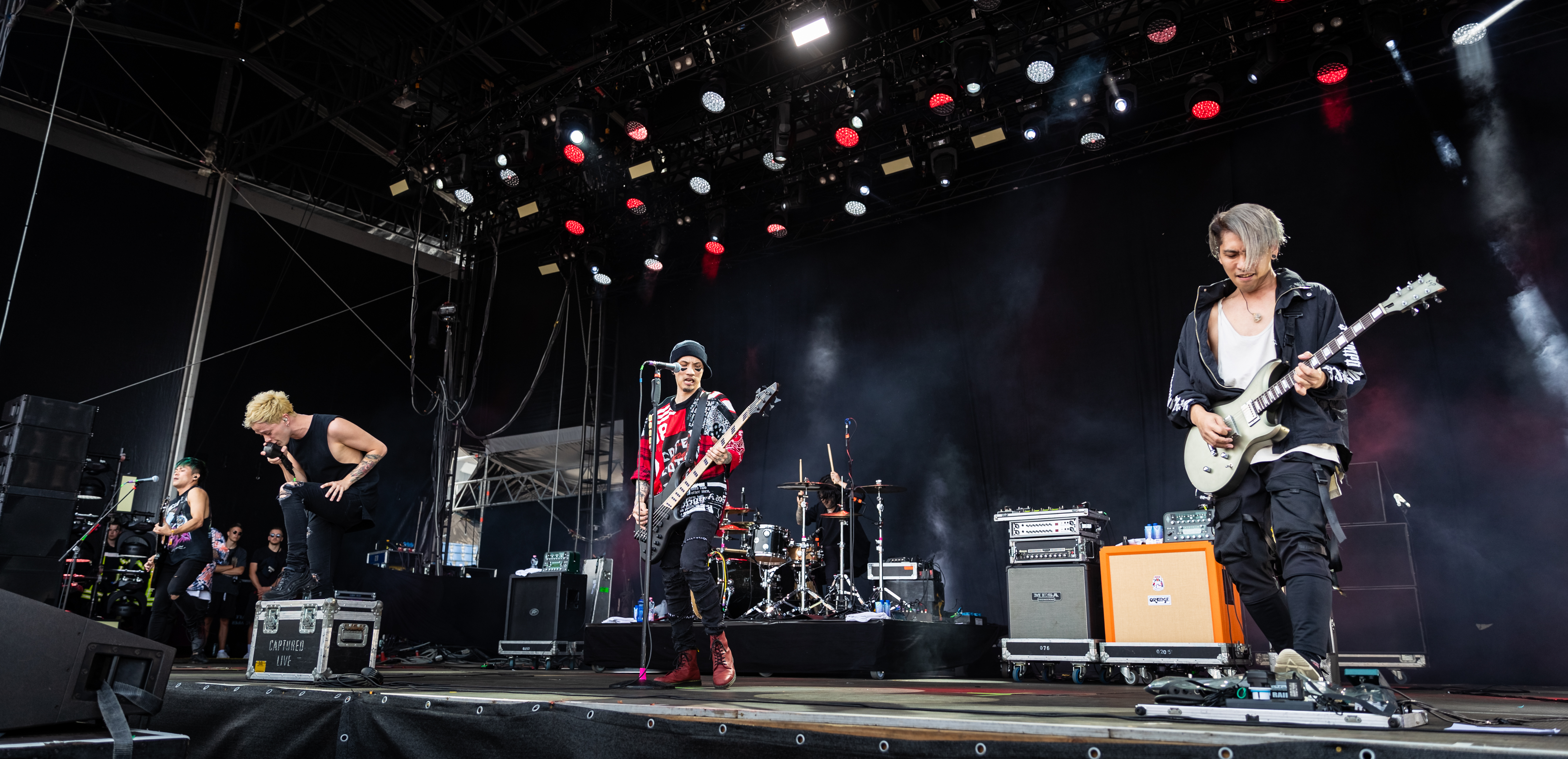
- Coldrain performing at Rock am Ring in 2019. Members (L–R): Sugi, Masato, RxYxO, Katsuma, and Y.K.C.

Background information
- Origin: Nagoya, Aichi, Japan
- Genres: Post-hardcore; metalcore; nu metal; alternative metal; alternative rock; hard rock; punk rock (early)
- Years active: 2007–present
- Labels: VAP; Warner Music Japan; Century Media; Hopeless; Sony Music Japan; Sony Music Australia
- Members: Masato Hayakawa; Ryo Yokochi; Kazuya Sugiyama; Ryo Shimizu; Katsuma Minatani
- Website: coldrain.jp

Coldrain (stylised in all lowercase) are a Japanese rock band from Nagoya, Japan, who were formed in 2007. The band combines melodic singing with screams typical of the post-hardcore and metalcore genres. Although the band is Japanese, all of their songs are written in English. Since its formation in 2007, the band retained the same lineup with no member changes. The lineup consists of lead vocalist Masato Hayakawa, guitarists Ryo Yokochi (Y.K.C.) and Kazuya Sugiyama (Sugi), bassist Ryo Shimizu (RxYxO) and drummer Katsuma Minatani. Hayakawa has a Japanese father and an American mother and speaks both Japanese and English fluently.

The band's first two albums, Final Destination (2009) and The Enemy Inside (2011), were both released exclusively in their home country of Japan. The group made their worldwide debut in 2014 with the reissue of The Revelation, which was previously released in 2013 under the label VAP, with the worldwide edition being released under Hopeless Records and Sony Music.

Coldrain later released Vena (2015), Fateless (2017) and The Side Effects (2019) and Nonnegative (2022). In 2025, the band signed with Century Media Records and released their eighth studio album Optimize = Optdemise, a double album including their fifth EP Optimize (2025), which was released on 25 September 2026. They are best known for their songs "Mayday", "Gone", "Coexist", "Paradise (Kill the Silence)", "Vengeance", "Die Tomorrow", "No Escape", "The Revelation", "Envy" and "Feed the Fire".

== History ==
=== 2007–2008: Formation and major label debut ===
After the disbanding of the bands Wheel of Life (RxYxO, Sugi and Y.K.C.) and AVER (Masato and Katsuma), Coldrain was formed on 17 April 2007, in Nagoya with Masato Hayakawa on vocals, RxYxO (Ryo) on bass guitar, Katsuma on drums, and Y.K.C (Yokochi) and Sugi on guitars. The common musical interest of the members was one of the decisive factors in the formation of coldrain. Once, when AVER and Wheel of Life first co-debuted on stage, and AVER heard Sevendust's song played during Wheel of Life's rehearsal, an excited Katsuma asked RxYxO, "Don't tell me you're a fan of Sevendust as well!?" Thereafter, each time they interacted, they wanted to form a new band together. RxYxO was originally doing vocals, but became a bassist because of coldrain. The band gained their first followers from performing as a local band in their home-town while distributing demo discs after each performance.

About a year after coldrain formed, they signed a major contract with VAP, and the band released their debut maxi single "Fiction" on 5 November 2008. They then set off for their first nationwide tour and played in 30 venues across Japan.

=== 2009–2011: Final Destination and The Enemy Inside ===
After the tour, the group released their next maxi single: 8AM. The limited edition included a DVD which featured the music video of the title song and three live videos: "Fiction", "Painting", and "Come Awake". "8AM" was also used as a theme song to the anime series Hajime no Ippo: New Challenger. In 2009, saw their first performance at the Summer Sonic Festival 2009. In October, they released their first album Final Destination and embarked on another successful sold-out nationwide tour.

The band released their debut EP: Nothing Lasts Forever on 23 June 2010. One of the songs, "We're Not Alone", was used as an opening theme of the anime series Rainbow: Nisha Rokubō no Shichinin. Another song, "Die Tomorrow", was used in the Pro Evolution Soccer 2011 soundtrack. They also went on tour with several bands, including Mucc, Avengers in sci-fi and Totalfat.

On 16 February 2011, Coldrain released their second album called The Enemy Inside, which keeps the melodic vocals and breakdown parts of the last songs. The song "The Maze" has Mah from band SiM singing in some parts. On 7 December of the same year, the band released their first DVD, Three Days of Adrenaline, which was recorded in three cities: Osaka, Nagoya and Tokyo. The DVD contains 19 tracks (all 10 songs from The Enemy Inside are included), 3 behind-the-scenes videos, exclusive performances, and the music videos of "To Be Alive" and "Rescue Me".

=== 2012–2013: The Revelation ===
The band's logotype, used since 2013

On 20 April 2012, the band released a new song, "No Escape", which was used in the official trailer for the video game Resident Evil: Operation Raccoon City; the song was on the band's new EP, Through Clarity, released on the following 4 July. This is their first album recorded abroad in the US. The EP was produced by David Bendeth, famous for his collaborations with international artists like Paramore, All Time Low and A Day to Remember.

On 1 August, it was announced that because drummer Katsuma was devoting himself to medical treatment for a chronic hereditary disease, he was temporarily withdrawing from the band. Katsuma's withdrawal period includes three people, ZAX (Pay Money to My Pain), Tatsu (Crossfaith), and YOUTH-K!!!(BPM13GROOVE), playing the role of support drummer. During the summer, they finally returned to the stage at Summer Sonic Festival 2012. On 4 November, at Hiroshima University of Economics, two bands held a live performance, Maximum the Hormone and Coldrain. At that point Katsuma returned to the band.

On 30 November, coldrain announced they would be in the studio from December to February to record their third studio album with David Bendeth. On 2 March 2013, they performed at Megaport Music Festival in Kaohsiung for 5,000 people, along with many other artists such as Grizzly Bear, Cyndi Wang, Boris, Head Phones President, SiM, LTK Commune, Guntzepaula and Chochukmo. Shortly afterward, on 17 April, they released their third full-length album, The Revelation. On 5 May, the band held the opening date of The Revelation Tour in Chiba, Japan, at the same location where they performed during Ozzfest on 12 May.

=== 2014: Worldwide debut ===
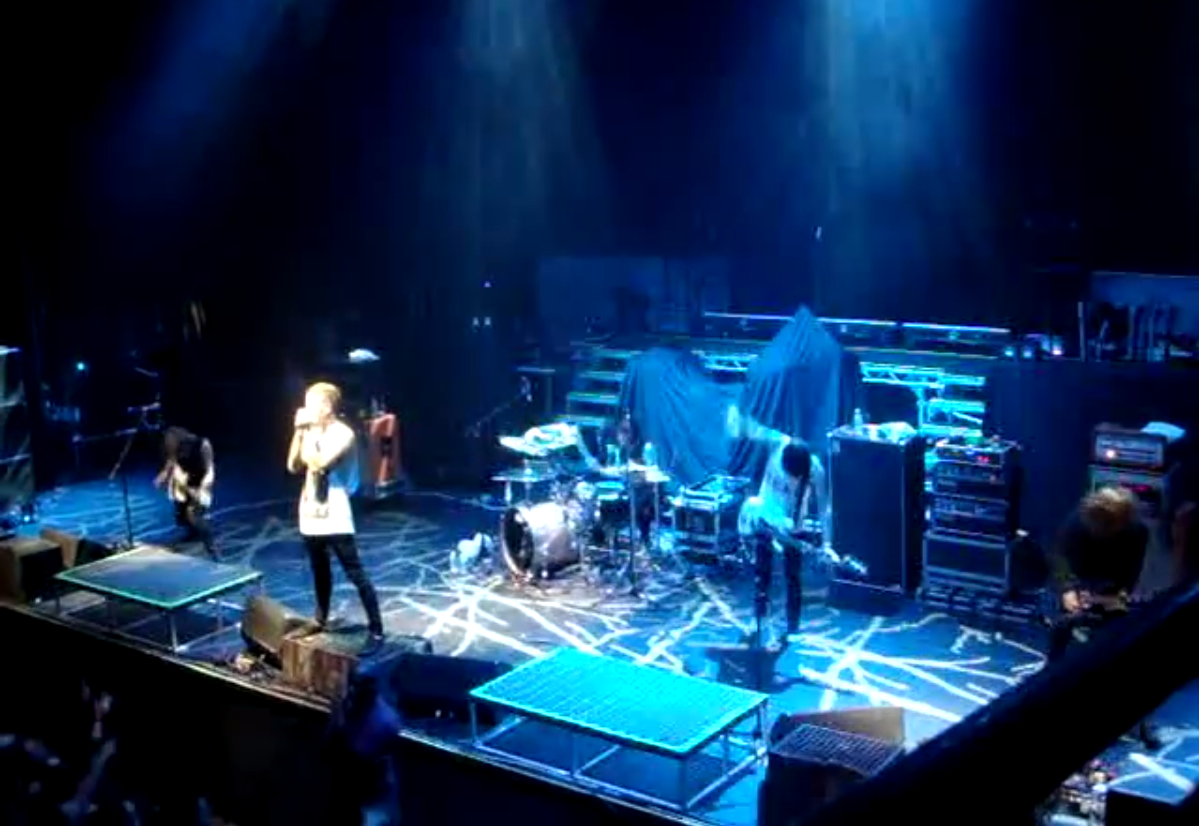
coldrain performing at L'Olympia on February 5, 2014

In December 2013, Coldrain signed a record deal with Raw Power Management, a British company with many international bands to its name, including Bullet for My Valentine, Bring Me the Horizon, Of Mice & Men and Crossfaith. This allowed the group to go on a European tour with Bullet for My Valentine and Chiodos between February and March. Subsequent headline dates were also announced for the United Kingdom, along with the European release of the EP Through Clarity on 27 January, with free download of the song "Inside of Me" if the EP was preordered.

On 21 February, they announced release of the DVD The Score 2007–2013. On 18 January they recorded a live show called "One Man Show Evolve" for their second DVD, Evolve, which was released on 30 April of the same year. The album was also available on Blu-ray Disc, for the first time for the group. During the same period came the news that coldrain would be performing at Rock am Ring, Rock im Park and Download Festival 2014 in June 2014.

On 9 April, the announcement came that coldrain had signed a contract with the American-based label Hopeless Records for a new edition of their third studio album, The Revelation, which would be released worldwide (except Asia, New Zealand, and Australia) for the first time. On the same day Hopeless released the eponymous single, "The Revelation".

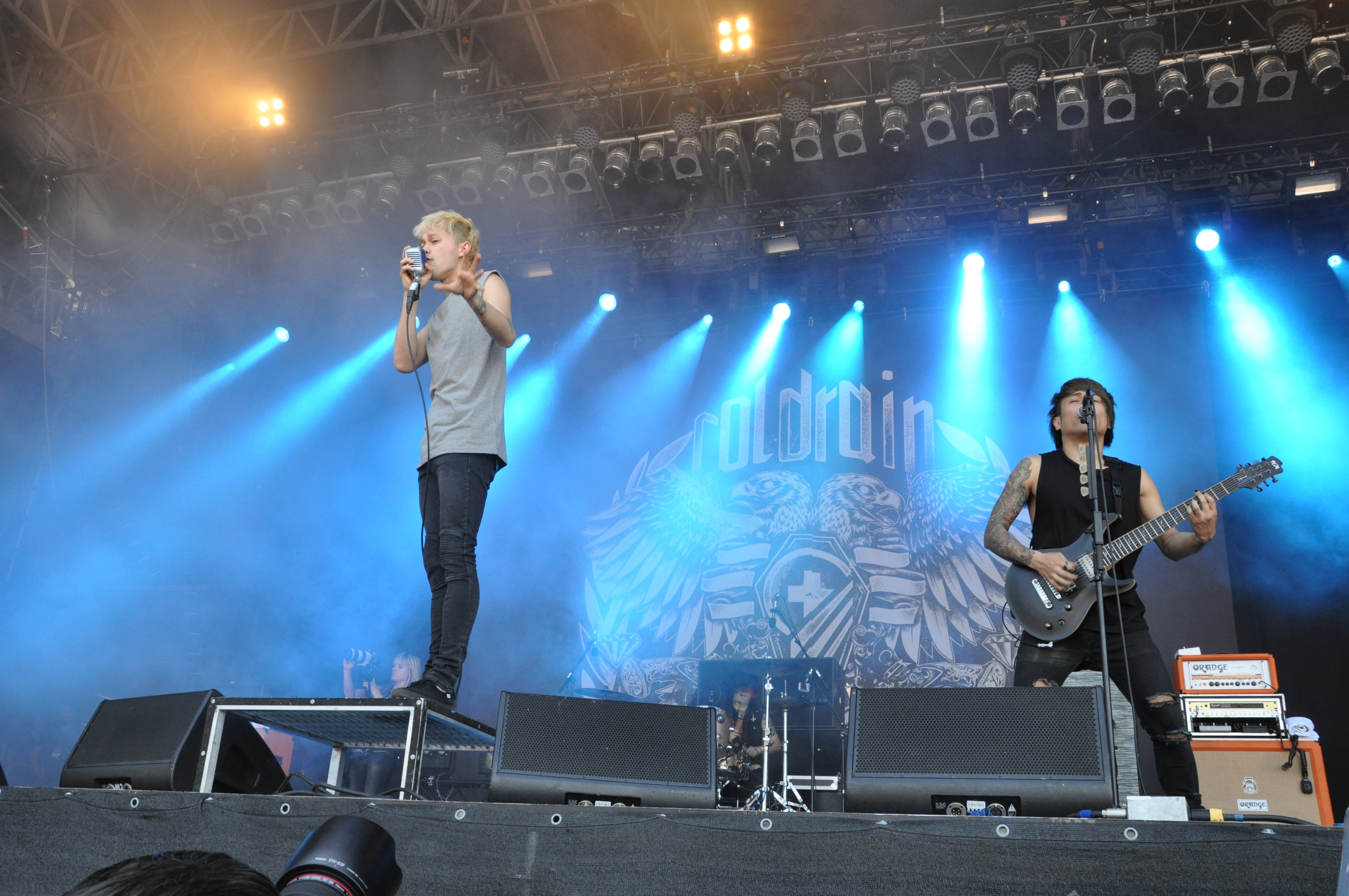
coldrain performing at Rock am Ring, 2014

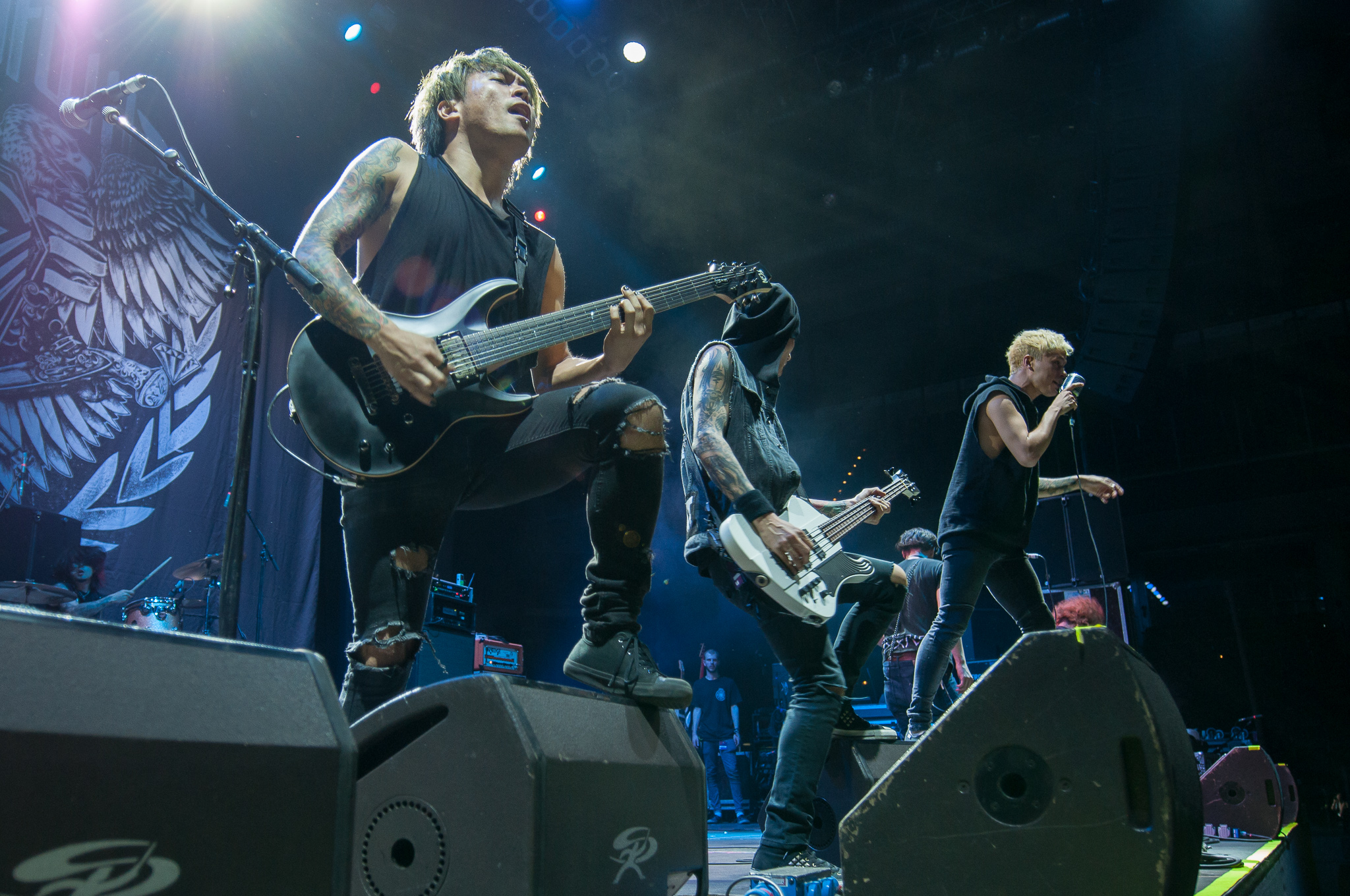
coldrain performing at Rock im Park, 2014

At the announcement of the international release of The Revelation, the singer Masato Hayakawa wrote:

"It's hard to put in words how excited and proud we are that The Revelation will be released Worldwide. The dream we've had ever since we started playing music is finally coming true. I can't wait for everyone to hear the songs, learn the words and sing them with us live. We are grateful for the many fans in our homeland that have supported us in becoming the band we are today. Without them this would have been impossible. This step will be the biggest in our careers and we couldn't be more ready."

The international edition of the album was subsequently released on 23 June in Europe, and 24 June in North America. On 18 June they also released their third EP, Until the End in Japan. The EP contains 6 new tracks, 5 of which were also included in the international edition of The Revelation, which was released by Hopeless Records in June 2014 in Europe and North America. The band also announced the album's release in Australia, scheduled for 8 August of the same year (by Sony Music Australia), along with the news that the band would perform at Soundwave Festival 2015.

=== 2015–2016: Vena ===
On 27 June 2015, they performed at the Lunatic Fest (hosted by Luna Sea) at Makuhari Messe, alongside 9mm Parabellum Bullet, Dead End, Tokyo Yankees, Siam Shade, Fear, and Loathing in Las Vegas, Dir En Grey, X Japan and Luna Sea. On 28 August, the band released the song "Words of the Youth" from Vena, another lead-single "Gone" was later released on 16 September, both from their upcoming fourth studio album, which was eventually released worldwide on 23 October 2015, which was released only two days prior, on 21 October, in Japan.

The record was promoted by a worldwide headlining tour "MAY EUROPEAN TOUR" with Wage War, The Charm the Fury and Counting Days in May 2016. The tour would start in Paris, France on 9 May and finished in Reading, England on 27 May. The tour would also feature a spot for the Japanese rockers at Slam Dunk Festival on 29, 30 May and 31.

Early in the morning of 20 March 2016, coldrain was involved in a bus crash while traveling from their recent stop in Texas to the next scheduled concert (support of "Silverstein 2016 USA Tour") in Oklahoma. They reported that no one was hurt, but they had to cancel their show in Tulsa as they had no means of transport to get there. In the summer, coldrain embarked on a tour across the United States (playing at Monster Energy South Stage) as a part of Vans Warped Tour.

On 17 August, Coldrain released their third maxi-single Vena II worldwide, with new songs "Born to Bleed" and "Undertow" and new acoustic versions of "Gone" and "The Story". The limited edition included a bonus DVD which featuring "VENA JAPAN TOUR 2016" held at Zepp Tokyo on 15 January 2016.

=== 2017–2018: Fateless ===
On 26 July 2017, Coldrain announced a new album to be called Fateless, it was released on 11 October 2017, worldwide. The limited edition of the album features a live CD with coldrain's 10-year anniversary performances in their hometown Nagoya. One of the songs, "Feed the Fire", was used as an opening theme of the anime series King's Game The Animation.

The band's official tour, FATELESS JAPAN TOUR 2017, began on 29 October 2017. The tour spanned approximately the following two months and 15 venues across Japan, ending with a concert on 6 February 2018, at the Nippon Budokan. Their performance at Nippon Budokan was recorded by their one of their previous music video director's Inni Vision. The performance was later distributed on DVD and Blu-Ray on 26 September the same year.

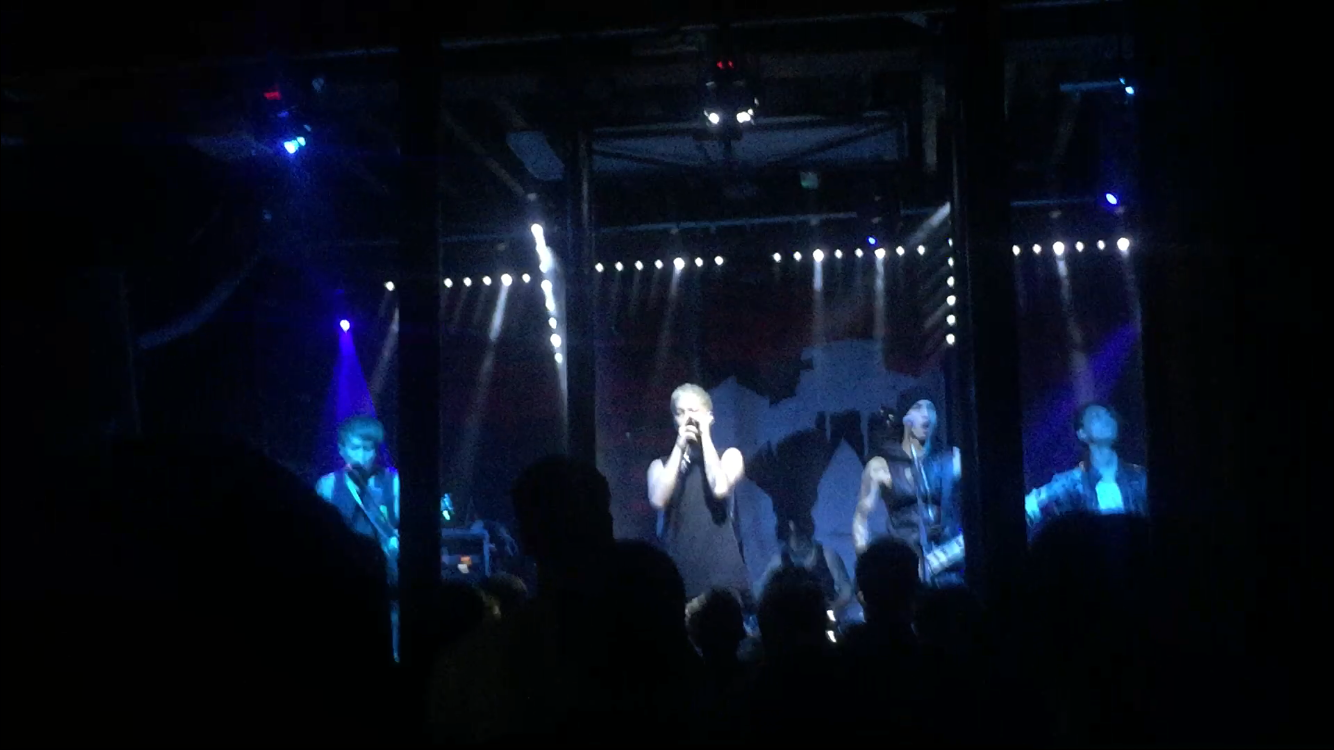
Coldrain performing in Bristol in 2018, alongside Crown the Empire

On 25 May 2018, it was announced that Coldrain would be an opening act alongside Volumes on Crown the Empire's European headline tour. The tour would span across the entire continent of Europe. It would start off at Brighton, United Kingdom on 18 September, and culminate in Amsterdam, Netherlands on 15 October 2018.

On 29 September 2018, a sequel to the popular video game Mobile Suit Gundam: Extreme Vs. was announced, with the release date slated for 30 October 2018. Alongside this, coldrain announced a new song titled "Revolution" which was to be the main theme for the game, released on 12 December. A music video for the song was released on 25 January 2019. Just a few days later, on 30 January, Masato Hayakawa announced that he was returning to the studio with the rest of the band to record a new album to be released later on in the year.

=== 2019–2021: The Side Effects ===
On 31 March 2019, Coldrain announced a new One Man Tour, which would be the subsequent headline show for the newly titled album called The Side Effects. The September tour would include 11 shows at 10 venues across Japan.

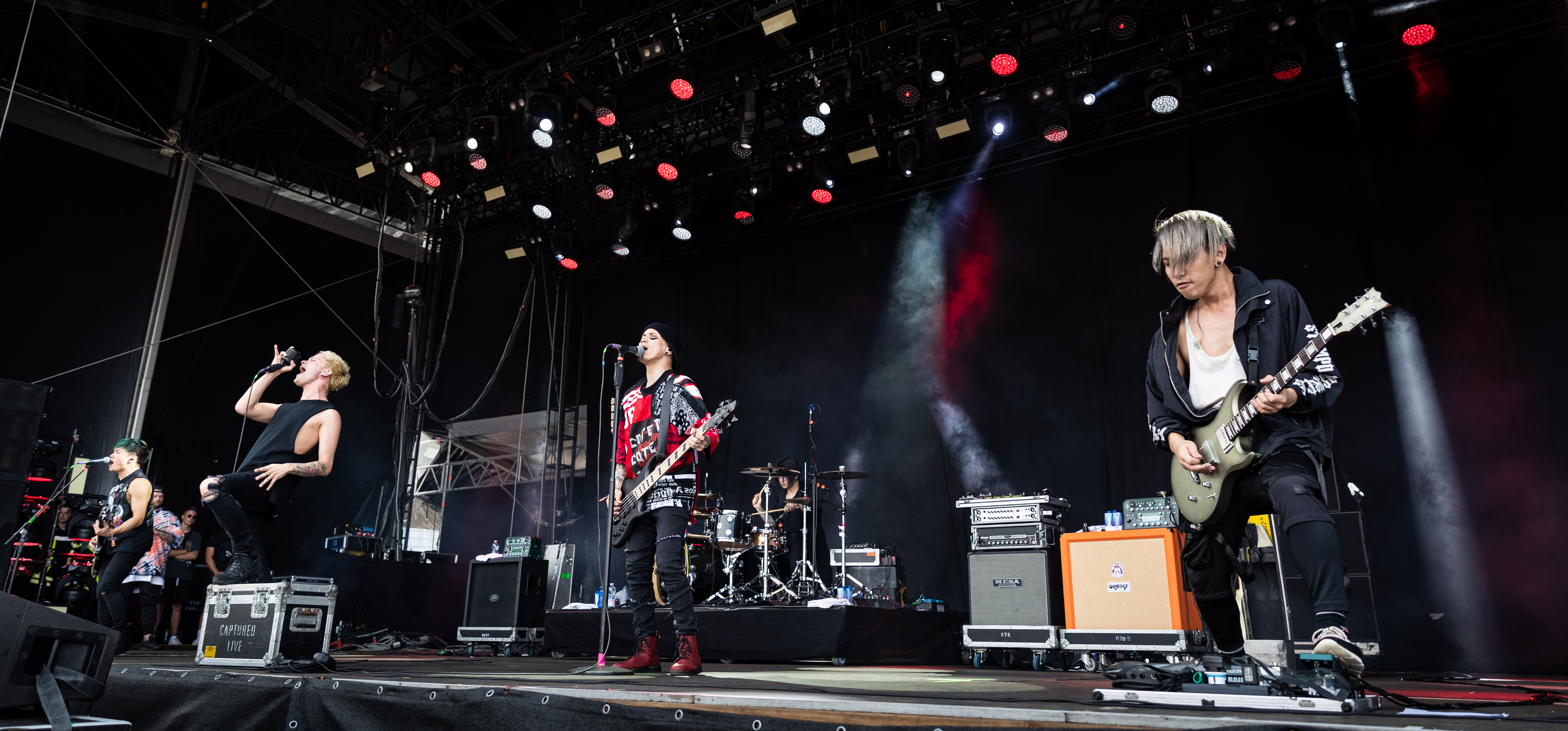
Coldrain live at Rock am Ring in 2019

Coldrain went on a European tour in June 2019 to promote their upcoming record by playing the first single "Revolution" at all their shows, including major festivals such as Rock am Ring and Rock im Park, finishing off at the highly acclaimed Download Festival where they played on the Dogtooth Stage.

On 16 May 2019, a teaser for The Side Effects was released on all social media accounts which used the song "Coexist" which was eventually released in its entirety as a single on 4 July alongside a music video to complement its release which stacked up more than 345K+ views in just 3 weeks, which made it the fastest-growing music video they ever had at the time of release. On the same day, the release date was also announced and slated for release on 28 August 2019. The first album to not be released in October, since the release of The Revelation back in 2013 and 2014 internationally. The limited-edition included a documentary on the process of making the album along with some merchandise.

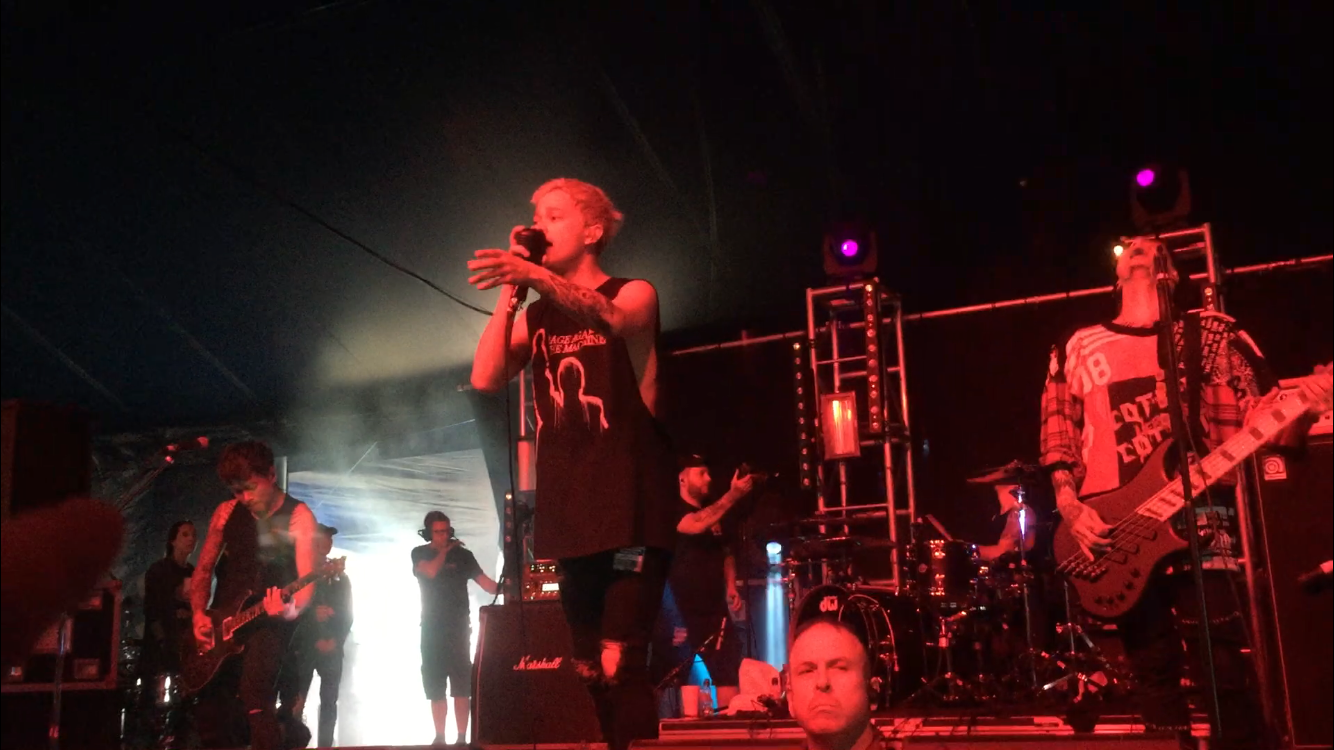
Coldrain performing live at Download Festival in 2019

To continue hyping the release of the forthcoming album, they released music videos for "January 1st" and "The Side Effects", on 8 and 27 August respectively; the songs came out to huge success. Hayakawa had specifically asked for "January 1st" to get a music video because it was deeply personal to him, a ballad for the band which typically wouldn't become a single for an album produced by the band. The latter being the title track was used to commemorate the release of The Side Effects. Another song called "Mayday", featuring Ryo Kinoshita from Crystal Lake, was also used as the opening theme for the anime Fire Force. This would also get a music video on 2 November, coinciding with the debut of the song as Fire Force's intro theme, also being the last single released by the band in the 2010s.

In the same month, Coldrain would later announce that their own annually hosted concert "BLAREDOWN BARRIERS" would be turned into a festival and renamed to "Blare Fest". Blare Fest would take place at Port Messe in Nagoya. The 2020 edition of the newly formed festival would announce bands such as One Ok Rock, We Came as Romans, Fever 333, The Word Alive, Volumes, Crossfaith and Crystal Lake, as well as many more, who would all play on two separate days with Coldrain headlining both days on 1 and 2 February.

The band would release two new music videos for The Side Effects: "See You" on 17 January 2020, and "Speak" on 21 March 2020.

Due to the COVID-19 pandemic, Coldrain was forced to cancel or postpone many gigs. As a result, they released all three of their live DVDs on YouTube for free for a limited amount of time to help entertain their fans during lockdown, including Three Days of Adrenaline, Evolve and 20180206 Live at Budokan, along with the music video for "Speak". A notable gig that got cancelled was their highly anticipated performance at the Yokohama Arena in Yokohama, which was scheduled for 18 October 2020, that was later cancelled on 4 September.

In regards to the performance at the Yokohama Arena, a venue of a capacity of 17,000, frontman Masato Hayakawa issued a statement:

"Blarefest back in February, which hosted and announced the international acts.

In June, I had no choice but to announce the postponement of the tour in a hope that self-exclusion would begin and converge. We'll be able to make it to the rocks by October, can't we?! I was thinking that it's all the same that I was expecting. However, the reality is that we can't get together as the first member after we put together Coldrain, the time when we can't play live blows, we can't perform even if we want to perform, we can't see any breakthroughs, and it's time to make this announcement. Now that various forms have been explored and the number of festivals and artists holding festivals and artists has increased by reducing the number of people, it may appear that it is possible to hold them somehow. But the final conclusion is that by the standards of Coldrain, we still can't see the "new shape" and we still have to endure it as a live band. However, I don't feel like I can see Coldrain live when social distancing comes in to think about how many people can be packed into the arena by attacking the last minute, and sticking to how close I can get to the audience. I was troubled. But there is no hesitation. Because the situation is a situation, we have to use the word cancellation instead of postponing it, but what we can promise now is that we will definitely do it someday. Without the risk or anxiety caused by the corona, let's endure it until it is in a state where we can help each other like that time, go on a rampage, scream from the bottom of our stomachs, and go home. Let's make a happy live performance as much as you can endure.

Until then, I pray for everyone's health and dream of being able to welcome Coldrain's Yokohama Arena performance in perfect condition. I'm not going to waste 10/18, and I'm trying to take on challenges that I've never done as a band that I can't see everyone live.

I'm just enduring it now, I'm not going to die! Regards from now on!"

Furthermore, it was simultaneously announced on the same day that the band would announce a new live video album Live & Backstage at Blare Fest. 2020 that would slated for release on 28 October 2020. It would feature their full performance on both days, as well as backstage footage of the band. To promote it, they released live performances of "Revolution" and "Final Destination" at Blarefest on the band's official YouTube channel.

The band would hold live events in the new year again amidst COVID-19 cases drastically dropping in Japan. They would go on a nationwide tour of Japan for their "Setlist Election" in which fans would vote for which songs will be performed on each day. Day 1 would be a selection of songs released from 2008–2013, while day 2 would be a selection of songs from 2014–2019. An official music video for "F.T.T.T" from Fateless would be recorded on the tour and published on YouTube on 4 June 2021.

=== 2021–2024: Nonnegative and Final Destination (XV Re:Recorded) ===
Wordmark of Coldrain, as used on their official website

On 6 August 2021, Coldrain revealed on their official Twitter account that they would be making an official announcement the following day to build up hype and speculation towards a new release by the band. The following day on 7 August, the band officially announced that they would be releasing a brand new single, titled "Paradise (Kill the Silence)" for the first time in two years on 17 September 2021, as well as a one-man tour announcement called "Paradise" in support of the single's release taking place during October and November 2021, with ticket sales already being allocated for the tour taking place in 12 different venues across Japan. An exclusive of "Paradise (Kill the Silence)" was unveiled to the world for the first time as a debut live performance on the second edition of "Coldrain TV" on 16 September 2021. Mere hours later at midnight JST, the single was released and the music video for "Paradise (Kill the Silence)" was premiered on YouTube.

On 2 January 2022, the band announced that they had joined TikTok. On 28 January, the band released an official live music video of "Paradise (Kill the Silence)" onto YouTube from their final ever live performance played at the Usen Studio Coast in Tokyo, Japan on 16 November 2021. They released it in commemoration of the venue during its closure.

On 29 January, the band announced to their fans on Line that they were in the US recording their full-length seventh studio album. Bassist Ryo Shimizu, later confirmed the news on Instagram on 31 January that they were indeed recording the follow-up to The Side Effects. However, they recorded the album in the studio without guitarist Kazuya Sugiyama who chose to record his parts of the album remotely in Japan due to recently having his first child. On 10 February, it was announced that the band had been selected for the opening theme for the new Netflix original anime Bastard!!, that would be slated to release in June 2022 on the platform. The band documented the process of the recording of the new album and published it under the title "7th Full Album Recording Diaries" onto YouTube over the course of the next couple of months. The first part was published on 11 February while the fourth and final part was released on 15 April. The series was directed by Masahiro Yamada. During this time, the band released official live videos of songs from their Three Elements concert from "Coldrain TV" onto their YouTube channel. They would first release the video for "Revolution" and continued to publish "After Dark", "Vena/F.T.T.T", "Rescue Me", "Mayday" featuring Ryo Kinoshita of Crystal Lake, "Carry On", "Gone" and "The Revelation" to then conclude with "January 1st" on 13 April 2022. Longtime producer for the band, Michael Baskette revealed on 20 March 2022, that the production for the album had concluded and that the band had flown back to Japan a couple of days prior after the recording process had been completed.

On 16 April, they held their fifteenth-anniversary live stream for their fans on YouTube which is where they formally revealed their seventh studio album Nonnegative for the first time. It was released on 6 July 2022, via Warner Music Japan. The previously released single "Paradise (Kill the Silence)" was revealed alongside a lineup of ten new original songs and a cover of No Doubt's "Don't Speak" to be included on the album. After the stream concluded and the clocks hit 00:00JST on 17 April in Japan, the band released the second single "Calling" from the album alongside a music video to commemorate their fifteen years together as a band.

On 4 June, the band were revealed to have provided a preview for one of the new songs from the album, "From Today", for the TV advert promoting the Aquos X LED 30. A couple of days later on 6 June, the band previewed the new single "Before I Go" as a part of the promotional campaign for the Sapporo Breweries product, Sapporo Beer Gold Star. They then fully released the song with an accompanying music video on 8 June. On 15 June, another song from the album, "Bloody Power Fame", was previewed in the new trailer as the opening theme for the Netflix anime, Bastard!! The song was later released as a single on 30 June alongside the release of the anime. On 6 July, the band released the fifth single, "Cut Me", alongside an accompanying music video concurrently with the album's release.

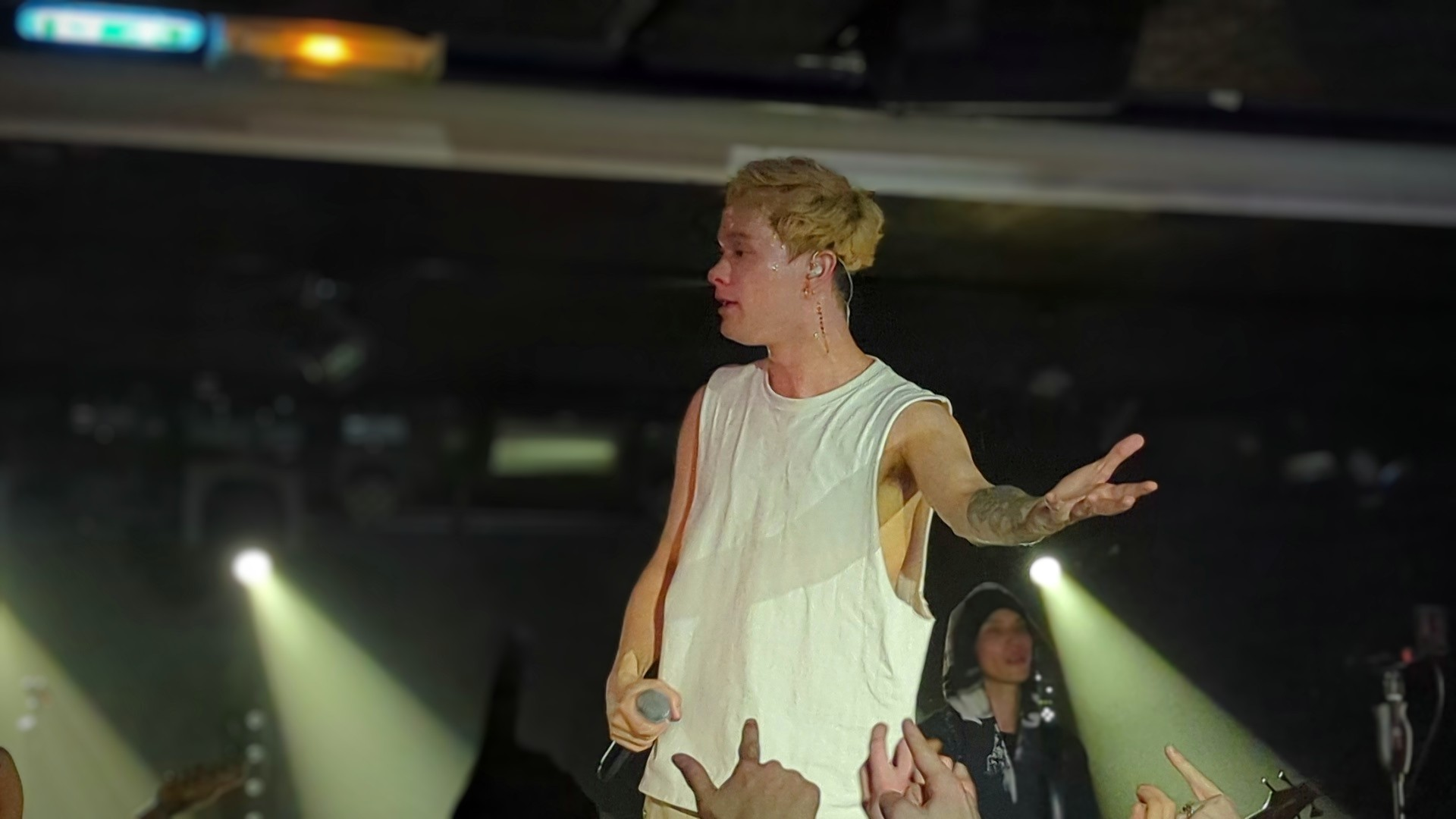
Coldrain performing live in Paris, France on their headline European Tour in 2024

On 5 September, the band appeared and performed at "Treasure9x4". During the performance, they announced the second edition of Blare Fest that was scheduled to take place on 4 & 5 February 2023. They later announced bands such as Hoobastank, Wargasm, Don Broco, Crystal Lake and SiM would be performing at the event as well as many others. On 15 January 2023, it was announced that the band would be supporting Papa Roach and The Used on their co-headline "Cut My Heart Into Pieces" Australian tour in April 2023, starting in Perth, Australia on 21 April and ending on 30 April in Brisbane, with that being the only show that the band would unable to attend due to scheduling conflicts. On 2 February, the band announced their fifth live video album, 15x(5+U) Live at Yokohama Arena, initially scheduled to be released on 19 April 2023. It was however later postponed due to the band being unable to require the licensing rights to include "Don't Speak" in the release, the edit in content caused the album to be delayed to 17 May. A live music video for "Calling" recorded at the arena was released alongside the initial announcement.

On 30 May, it was announced that Bastard! would be renewed for a second season that would start airing on 31 July 2023. Alongside this announcement, it was revealed that the band would retain their status as the opening theme with a new song titled "New Dawn" that was made available as a single on 2 August.

In January 2024, it was reported that the band would be releasing a new unspecified song as the opening theme for Adult Swim's anime Ninja Kamui. "Vengeance" was released as a single accompanied by a music video on 11 February 2024, concurrent with the release of Ninja Kamui. The band initially released it alongside the fifteenth anniversary recording of Final Destination as an exclusive CD at the band's homecoming performance in Nagoya on 10 February, where they debuted "Vengeance" live for the first time. Due to high fan demand, the fifteenth anniversary re-recording of Final Destination titled Final Destination (XV Re:Recorded) was released digitally on 26 May 2024. On 14 November 2024, the band announced that their homecoming live performance at Nippon Gaishi Hall in Nagoya will be released as their sixth live album.

=== 2025–present: Optimize = Optdemise ===
On 18 March 2025, the band formally announced that they had signed a global contract with German based label Century Media Records. Alongside the announcement, a new single "Incomplete" was revealed and was released on 20 March, being the band's first release on the new label. On 27 March, the band released the music video for "Incomplete" and simultaneously announced dates in Germany for August 2025, including festival appearances at Summer Breeze, Open Flair, and Reload. On 4 April, the band announced a fullscale European headline tour, starting in Manchester, England on 22 November, that culminated in Frankfurt, Germany on 13 December.

On 11 July 2025, the band announced their fifth extended play Optimize, that would be released in autumn of the same year. Concurrently, the band announced a One Man Tour across Japan to promote the release. On 6 August, the band released "Chasing Shadows" as the second single from Optimize. On 9 September, the band officially announced the release date for Optimize, slated as a five-track EP that released on 24 October. Simultaneously, the band announced two additional Asian dates in Taipei, Taiwan, and Hong Kong scheduled to take place at the beginning of November 2025. On 26 September, the band released the EP's third single "Free Fall" accompanied by the announcement of the first line-up of Blare Fest 2026, featuring bands such as One Ok Rock, SiM, Maximum the Hormone, Hanabie, House of Protection and Memphis May Fire. On 21 October, the band were announced to open for German electronicore band Electric Callboy on their Australian Arena Tour in September 2026 across six dates alongside American metalcore band Ice Nine Kills.

On 16 July 2026, the band teased their new single "Ex-Humanity" that was released the following day; it was unveiled as the lead single for their eighth studio album Optimize = Optdemise, acting as a sequel to Optimize, which was released on 25 September 2026. It is their first studio album since Vena (2015) to have a full scale worldwide release. On 28 August, the band released the album's second single "Poison", featuring Bert McCracken, the frontman from American rock band The Used. The band's captured performance at Blare Fest 2026 was included as part of the album's limited deluxe edition. Live footage of the previous EP's two deep cuts "Optimize" and "Digitoll" were released online as promotional live videos from the Blare Fest deluxe. On 27 September, the band released a three- minute album trailer medley for Optdemise alongside visualisers for the album's remaining songs. On 6 October, the band kicked off the album's sold out Japanese headline tour in Kawasaki, scheduled to conclude on 9 December in Tokyo after twelve dates. The tour's narration was provided by Japanese voice actress Yui Ishikawa.

In an interview on The Breakdown with Nath and Johnny in September 2026, frontman Masato Hayakawa teased big plans for a World Tour to commemorate the band's 20th anniversary in 2027. On 5 November, the band announced their first European tour date of 2027, playing at Resurrection Fest in Viveiro, Spain for their debut performance in the region.

== Artistry ==
The band's musical style has been described as post-hardcore, metalcore, alternative metal, alternative rock, punk rock, screamo, hard rock, nu metal, and electronic rock.

Early in its career the band played songs that sounded like alternative rock and especially post-hardcore, accompanied by guitar pieces reminiscent of classic metalcore and thrash metal riffs. By their third album, The Revelation, coldrain's music came to be defined as a mix of post-hardcore and metalcore. According to other critics, certain influences instead recall genres like pop punk and screamo, and the band has been likened to groups like My Chemical Romance, Pay Money to My Pain, Asking Alexandria, Destroy Rebuild Until God Shows, Bullet for My Valentine and A Day to Remember. Masato Hayakawa has stated Linkin Park and Incubus to have been his biggest influences to start recording music. RxYxO named J, Rikiji, Tim Commerford, Vinnie Hornsby and Sam Rivers as his favorite bassists. When Y.K.C, the main composer in the band, was asked about songwriting, he said, "It is essential not to forget 'why a song is cool', the song itself needs to have holding power, and only then is there meaning. That's what I try not to forget when composing."

Other bands and artists Masato Hayakawa has sited as an influence are Limp Bizkit, Korn, Hoobastank, Papa Roach, Metallica, Pearl Jam, The Used, Silverchair, Slipknot, Sevendust, Michael Jackson, Mariah Carey, Hikaru Utada and L'Arc-en-Ciel, his biggest influences on his singing style are Chester Bennington and Brandon Boyd

== Band members ==
Coldrain live at Rock Am Ring 2019

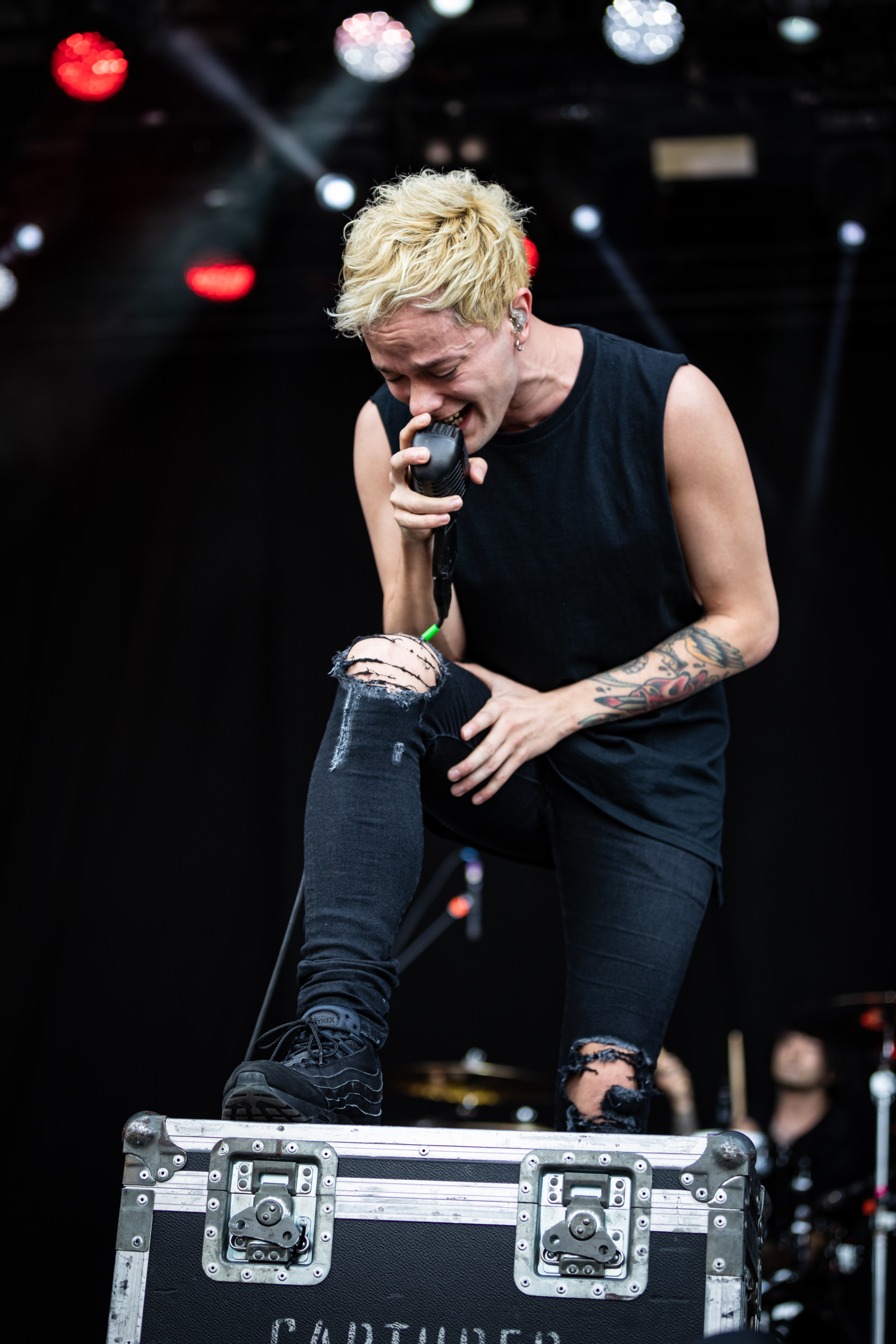
Masato Hayakawa

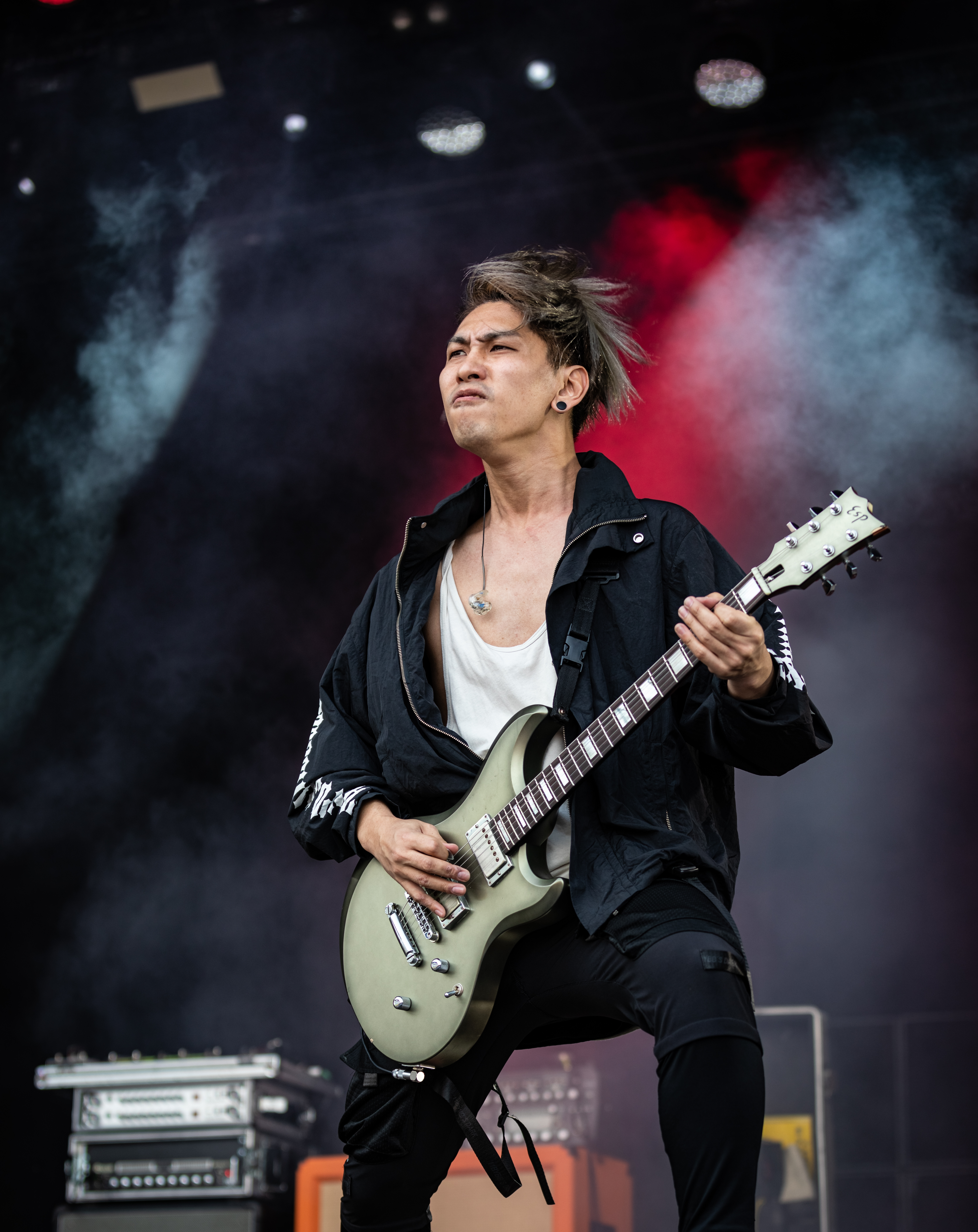
Ryo Yokochi

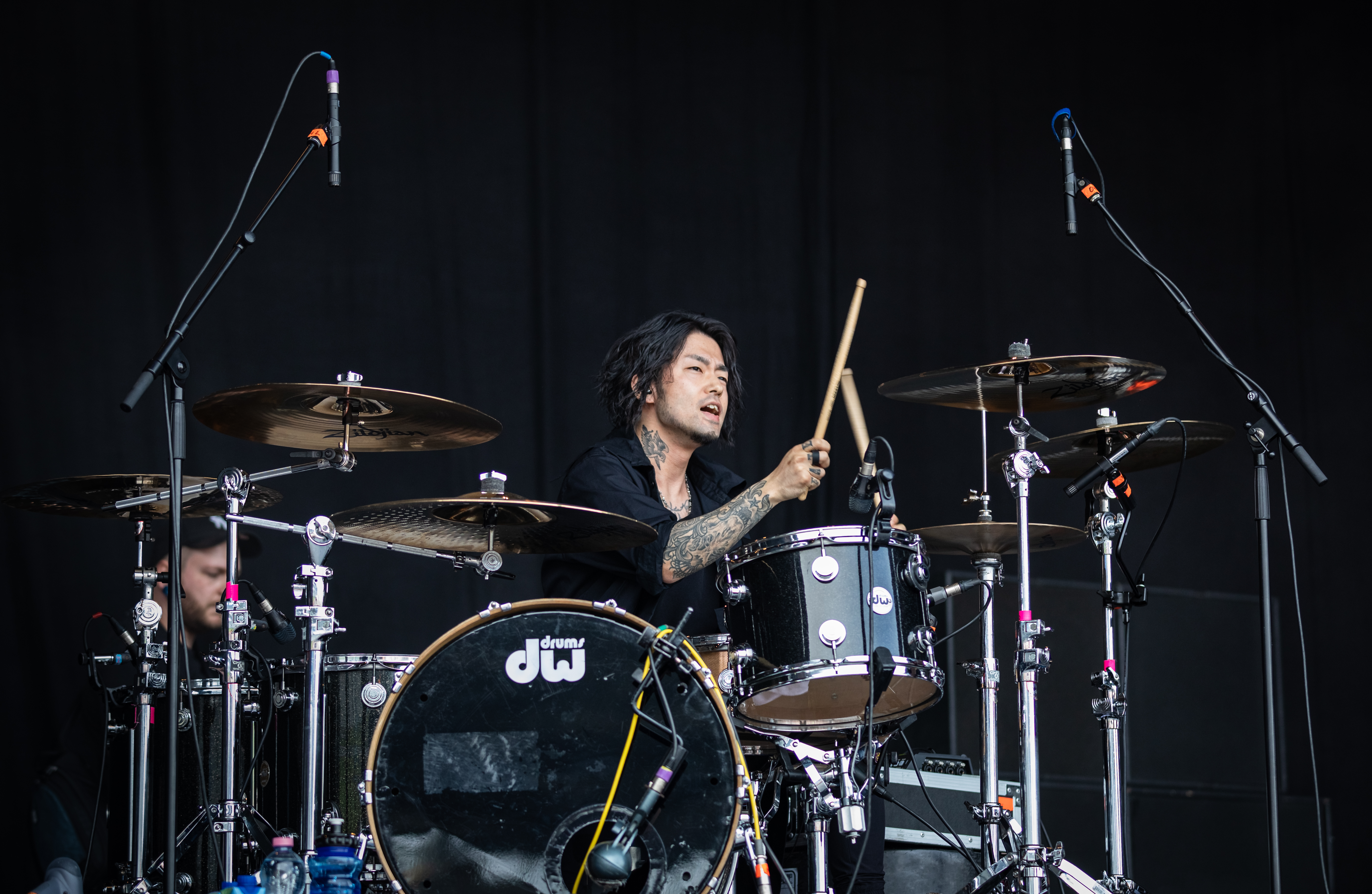
Katsuma Minatani

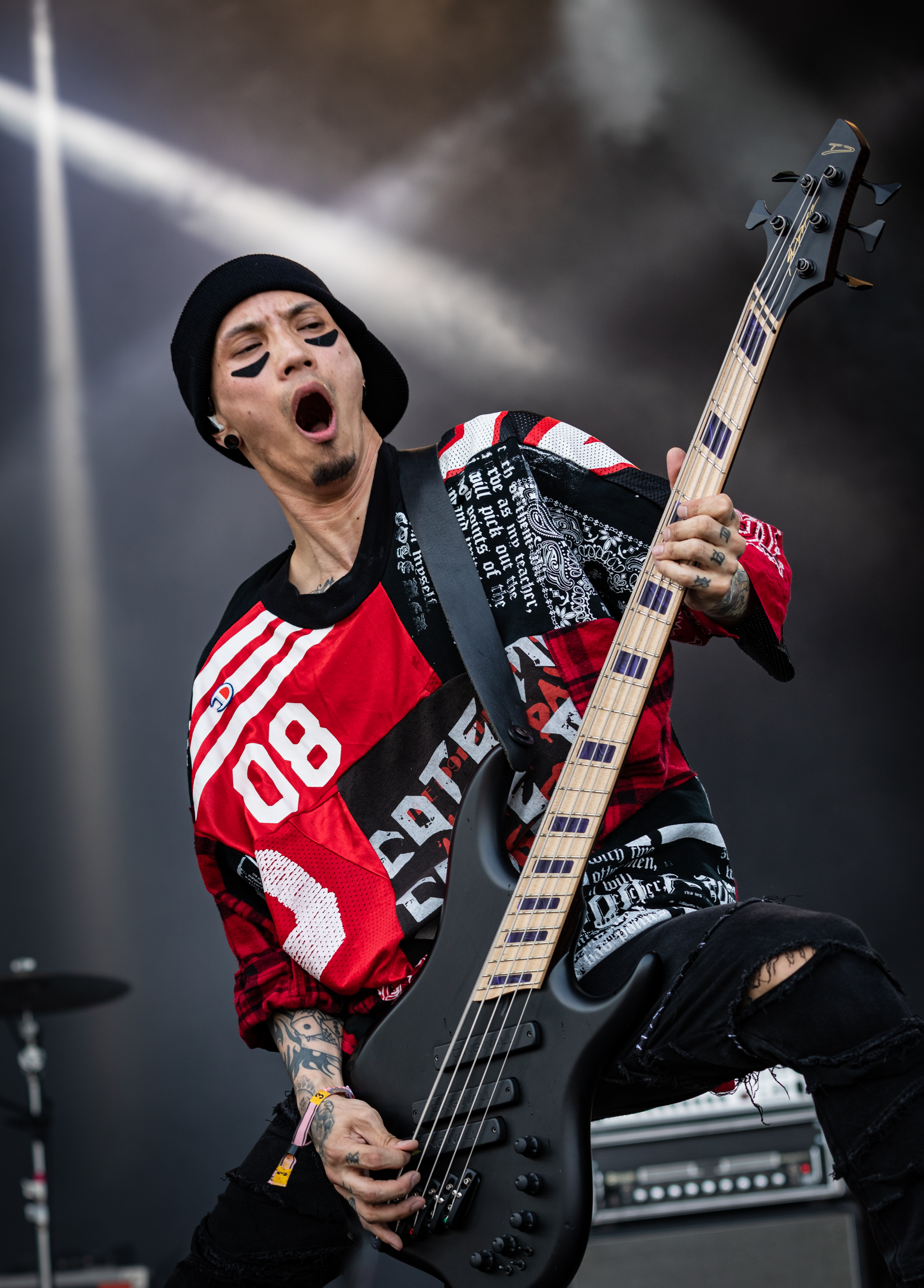
Ryo Shimizu

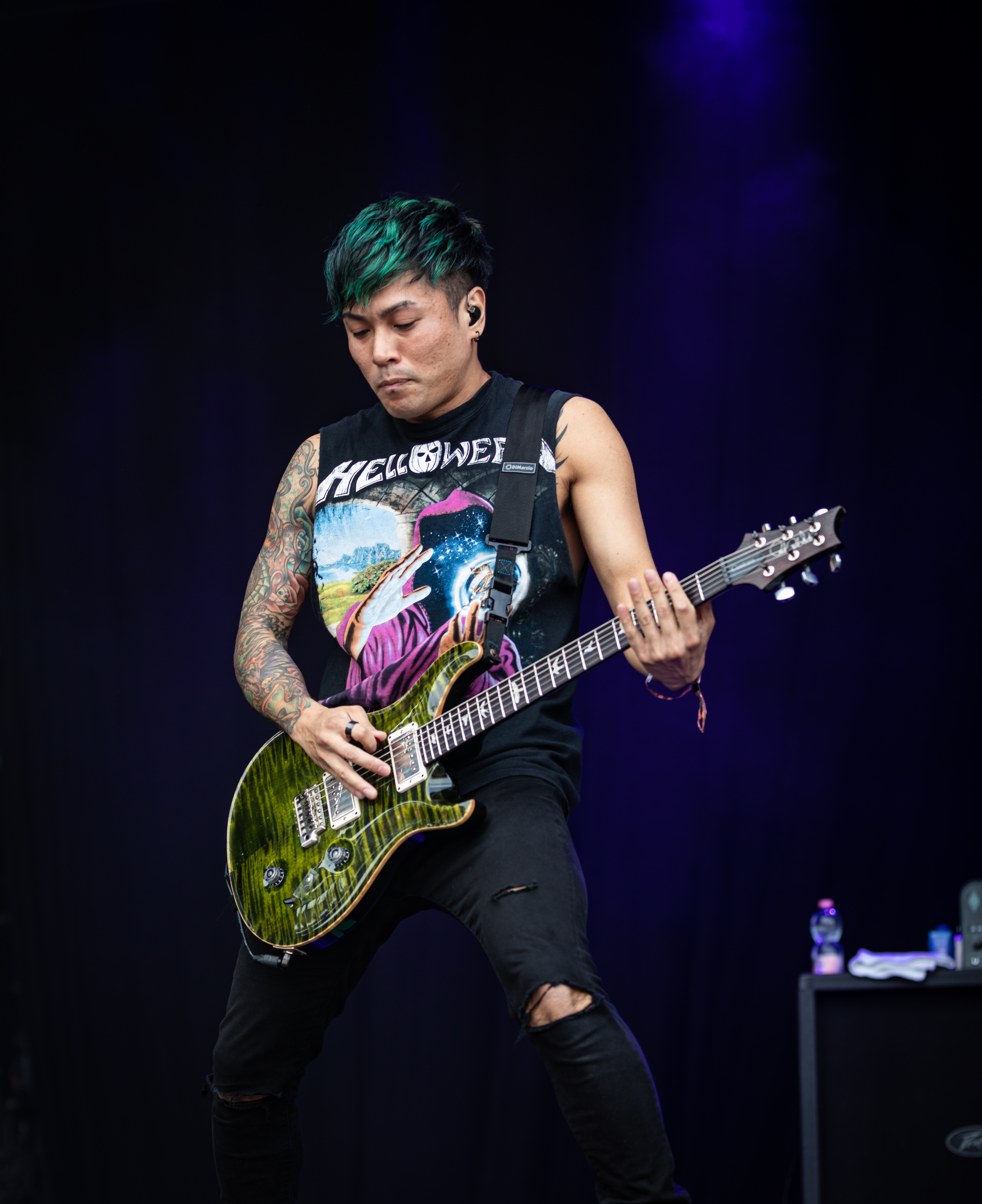
Kazuya Sugiyama

Members

- Masato David Hayakawa (マサト, Masato) – lead vocals (2007–present)
- Ryo Yokochi (ヨコチ, Y.K.C.) – lead guitar, programming, piano, keyboards (2007–present)
- Kazuya Sugiyama (スギ, Sugi) – rhythm guitar, baritone guitar, backing vocals (2007–present)
- Ryo Shimizu (リョウ, RxYxO) – bass guitar, backing vocals (2007–present)
- Katsuma Minatani (カツマ, Katsuma) – drums, percussion (2007–present)

Former touring musicians

- Jin "Zax" Kanza – drums (2012; substitute for Katsuma Minatani)
- Tatsuya Amano – drums (2012; substitute for Katsuma Minatani)
- Youth-K – drums (2012; substitute for Katsuma Minatani)

== Discography ==
Coldrain discography
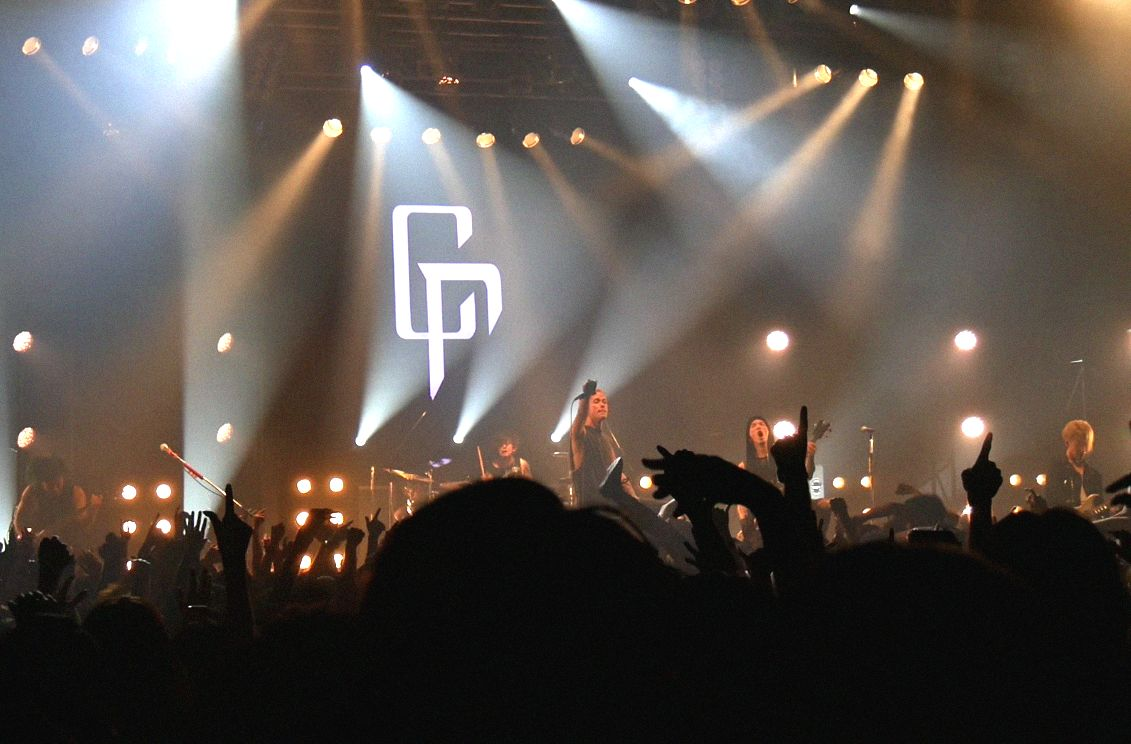
- Coldrain performing in Tokyo in 2017
- Studio albums: 7
- Extended plays: 6
- Demo albums: 2
- Live albums: 6
- Singles: 40
- Music videos: 41
- Re-recorded albums: 1
- Maxi singles: 3

=== Albums ===
==== Studio albums ====
List of studio albums, with selected chart positions and sales figures
Title	Album details	Peak chart positions				Sales
Title	Album details	JPN Oricon	JPN Billboard	AUS Hit.	UK Indie Break	Sales
Final Destination	Released: 28 October 2009; Label: VAP; Formats: CD, digital download	88	73	—	—	
The Enemy Inside	Released: 16 February 2011; Label: VAP; Formats: CD, digital download	21	22	—	—	
The Revelation	Released: 17 April 2013; Label: VAP, Hopeless, Sony; Formats: CD, digital download	7	7	4	—	
Vena	Released: 21 October 2015; Label: VAP, Hopeless; Formats: CD, digital download	9	10	—	15	US: 310
Fateless	Released: 11 October 2017; Label: Warner Music Japan; Formats: CD, digital download	8	8	—	—	JPN: 12,980
The Side Effects	Released: 28 August 2019; Label: Warner Music Japan; Formats: CD, digital download	10	8	—	—	JPN: 9,811
Nonnegative	Released: 6 July 2022; Label: Warner Music Japan; Formats: CD, digital download	15	11	—	—	JPN: 7,826
Optimize = Optdemise	Released: 25 September 2026; Label: Sony Music, Century Media; Formats: CD, LP, digital download	14	13	—	—	JPN: 3,676
"—" denotes items which did not chart.

===== Re-recordings =====
List of re-recorded studio albums, with selected chart positions
Title	Album details	Peak chart positions
Title	Album details	JPN Down.
Final Destination (XV Re:Recorded)	Released: 10 February 2024; Label: Warner Music Japan; Formats: CD, digital download, streaming	74

==== Live albums ====
List of live albums, with selected chart positions
Title	Album details	Peak positions	
Title	Album details	JPN BD	JPN DVD
Three Days of Adrenaline	Released: 7 December 2011; Label: VAP; Format: DVD	—	31
Evolve	Released: 30 April 2014; Label: VAP; Formats: BD, DVD	13	12
20180206 Live at Budokan	Released: 26 September 2018; Label: Warner Music Japan; Formats: BD, DVD	24	9
Live & Backstage at Blare Fest. 2020	Released: 28 October 2020; Label: Warner Music Japan; Formats: BD, DVD	20	6
15x(5+U) Live at Yokohama Arena	Released: 17 May 2023; Label: Warner Music Japan; Formats: BD, DVD, digital download	16	11
Homecoming Live at Nippon Gaishi Hall	Released: 31 January 2025; Label: Warner Music Japan; Formats: BD, DVD, LP	—	—

==== Demo albums ====
List of demo albums, with selected details
Title	Album details
1st	Released: 2007; Label: Self-released; Format: CD
Coldrain	Released: 11 January 2008; Label: Gil Soundworks; Format: CD

=== Extended plays ===
List of extended plays, with selected chart positions
Title	EP details	Peak chart positions	
Title	EP details	JPN Oricon	JPN Billboard
Nothing Lasts Forever	Released: 23 June 2010; Label: VAP; Formats: CD, digital download	63	49
Through Clarity	Released: 4 July 2012; Label: VAP; Formats: CD, digital download	14	13
Until the End	Released: 18 June 2014; Label: VAP; Formats: CD, digital download	17	15
Paradise (Kill the Silence)	Released: 17 September 2021; Label: Warner Music Japan; Formats: Digital download	—	14
Optimize	Released: 24 October 2025; Label: Sony Music, Century Media; Formats: CD, digital download	—	—
Ex-Humanity	Released: 17 July 2026; Label: Sony Music, Century Media; Formats: Digital download	—	—
"—" denotes items which did not chart.

=== Singles ===
==== Maxi-singles ====
List of maxi-singles, with selected chart positions
Title	Year	Peak positions	Album
Title	Year	JPN Oricon	Album
"Fiction"	2008	181	Final Destination
"8AM"	2009	111	Final Destination
"Vena II"	2016	21	Non-album single
"—" denotes items which did not chart.

==== Digital singles ====
Title	Year	Album
"Final Destination"	2009	Final Destination
"Die Tomorrow"	2010	Nothing Lasts Forever
"To Be Alive"	2011	The Enemy Inside
"Rescue Me"	2011	The Enemy Inside
"No Escape"	2012	Through Clarity
"Six Feet Under"	2012	Through Clarity
"Inside of Me"	2012	Through Clarity
"The Revelation"	2013	The Revelation
"The War Is On"	2013	The Revelation
"Behind the Curtain"	2014	The Revelation
"Aware and Awake"	2014	Until the End; The Revelation (International)
"You Lie"	2014	Until the End; The Revelation (International)
"Evolve"	2015	Until the End; The Revelation (International)
"Time Bomb"	2015	The Revelation
"Words of the Youth"	2015	Vena
"Gone"	2015	Vena
"Wrong"	2016	Vena
"The Story"	2016	Vena
"Fire in the Sky"	2016	Vena
"Envy"	2017	Fateless
"Feed the Fire"	2017	Fateless
"R.I.P."	2017	Fateless
"Revolution"	2018	The Side Effects
"Coexist"	2019	The Side Effects
"January 1st"	2019	The Side Effects
"The Side Effects"	2019	The Side Effects
"Mayday" (feat. Ryo Kinoshita)	2019	The Side Effects
"See You"	2020	The Side Effects
"Speak"	2020	The Side Effects
"Paradise (Kill the Silence)"	2021	Nonnegative
"Calling"	2022	Nonnegative
"Before I Go"	2022	Nonnegative
"Bloody Power Fame"	2022	Nonnegative
"Cut Me"	2022	Nonnegative
"New Dawn"	2023	Non-album single
"Vengeance"	2024	Final Destination (XV Re:Recorded)
"Incomplete"	2025	Optimize
"Chasing Shadows"	2025	Optimize
"Free Fall"	2025	Optimize
"Ex-Humanity"	2026	Optimize = Optdemise
"Poison" (feat. Bert McCracken)	2026	Optimize = Optdemise

=== Covers ===
Song	Year	Original artist	Album
"Stuck"	2010	Stacie Orrico	Nothing Lasts Forever
"Uninvited"	2017	Alanis Morissette	Fateless
"Don't Speak"	2022	No Doubt	Nonnegative

=== Compilation appearances ===
Song	Year	Appearance
"8AM"	2009	Hajime no Ippo New Challenger Ending Theme
"We're Not Alone"	2010	Rainbow: Nisha Rokubō no Shichinin Main Theme
"Die Tomorrow"	2010	Pro Evolution Soccer 2011 Soundtrack
"Chandler"	2011	V.A. :Fuck The Borderline -A Tribute to Kuroyume-
"No Escape"	2012	Resident Evil: Operation Raccoon City Japanese Official Trailer
"Six Feet Under"	2012	Vans Compilation Loud Session!!!! Vans x Bands 2
"Evolve"	2015	Shinjuku Swan Inspired Tracks
"Wrong"	2016	Vans Warped Tour 2016 Compilation Album
"Feed the Fire"	2017	King's Game The Animation Opening Theme
"Revolution"	2018	Mobile Suit Gundam: Extreme Vs 2 Main Theme
"Mayday" (featuring Ryo Kinoshita of Crystal Lake)	2019	Fire Force Opening Theme
"Coexist"	2019	100 Greatest 2019 Songs (Best Songs of the Year)
"Elevator"	2019	ROTTENGRAFFTY "Mouse Trap" Tribute Album
"Coexist"	2020	100 Greatest Metal
"From Today"	2022	Aquos Xled 30 Japanese TV Advert
"Before I Go"	2022	Sapporo Beer Gold Star Promotional Campaign
"Bloody Power Fame"	2022	Bastard!! Season 1 Opening Theme
"Paradise (Kill the Silence)"	2023	New Balance MET24 "METropolitan 24 Hour Survival Game" TV Advert
"Help Me Help You"	2023	New Emperor of Minami Opening Theme
"New Dawn"	2023	Bastard!! Season 2 Opening Theme
"Vengeance"	2024	Ninja Kamui Opening Theme

=== Collaborations ===
Song	Year	Artist	Album
"Demise and Kiss" (featuring Masato Hayakawa)	2011	Crossfaith	The Dream, the Space
"Dead Dust" (featuring Masato Hayakawa)	2013	Before My Life Fails	(For)Lorn
"Resurrection" (featuring Masato Hayakawa, and Hazuki of Lynch)	2013	Pay Money to My Pain	Gene
"Free the Monster" (featuring Masato Hayakawa, and Kenta Koie of Crossfaith)	2016	AA=	Free the Monster
"Free the Monster_#5ver." (featuring Masato Hayakawa, and Kenta Koie of Crossfaith)	2016	AA=	#5
"Free the Monster (Live)" (featuring Masato Hayakawa, and Kenta Koie of Crossfaith)	2016	AA=	Live No. 5 at Liquidroom 20160611
"Skyfall" (featuring Masato Hayakawa, MAH of SiM, and Koie of Crossfaith)	2017	One Ok Rock	Non-album single
"Bumps in the Night" (featuring Masato Hayakawa)	2017	Miyavi	Samurai Sessions Vol. 2
"Take Me Higher" (featuring Katsuma Minatani)	2018	Duran	Face
"Faint" (featuring Masato Hayakawa)	2018	Crossfaith	Ex Machina
"The Circle" (featuring Masato Hayakawa)	2018	Crystal Lake	Non-album singles
"Endless Night" (featuring Katsuma Minatani)	2020	Dreamcatcher	Non-album singles
"Chemical Heart" (featuring Masato Hayakawa)	2020	Five New Old	Music Wardrobe
"Damage Control" (featuring Masato Hayakawa)	2021	Annalynn	A Conversation With Evil
"Revive" (featuring Katsuma Minatani)	2021	Duran	Kaleido Garden
"Rumble" (featuring Masato Hayakawa)	2023	Paledusk	Palehell
"Dunk" (featuring Masato Hayakawa)	2024	The Oral Cigarettes	AlterGeist0000
"All We Have" (featuring Masato Hayakawa)	2024	Nothing's Carved in Stone	Fire Inside Us
"Supernatural" (featuring Masato Hayakawa)	2024	Noisemaker	Non-album singles
"Kingsblood" (featuring Kazuya Sugiyama)	2025	Kala	The Beginning After the End Opening Theme
"Speak of the Devil" (featuring Masato Hayakawa)	2026	Survive Said the Prophet	Fire Force Season 3 Ending Theme
"Zion" (featuring Masato Hayakawa)	2026	SiM	Hooman After All

== Awards and nominations ==
Space Shower Music Awards

Year (Note: Indicates the year of ceremony. Each year is linked to the article about the awards held that year, wherever possible.)	Recipient(s)	Category	Result	Ref.
2020	Coldrain	Best Punk/Loud Rock Artist	Nominated	
2021	Triple Axe	Best Punk/Loud Rock Artist	Won	

== Concert tours ==
=== Headlining ===
- Final Destination Tour (2009)
- Nothing Lasts Forever Tour (2010)
- The Enemy Inside Tour (2011)
- Through Clarity Tour (2012)
- The Revelation Tour (2013)
- Until the End Tour (2014)
- Vena Japan Tour (2015–16)
- Vena European May 2016 Tour (2016)
- Fateless A Decade in the Rain Tour (2017)
- Another Decade in the Rain Tour (2018)
- Summer 2019 European Tour (2019)
- The Side Effects One Man Tour (2019)
- Paradise One Man Tour (2021)
- Nonnegative Tour (2022)
- Brisbane Headline Show (2023)
- February 2024 European Tour (2024)
- Summer in Germany Tour (2025)
- Optimize Asian Tour (2025)
- Optimize European Tour (2025)
- Optimize = Optdemise Japan Tour (2026)

=== Supporting ===
- Crossfaith Apocalyze Japan Tour (2013)
- Man with a Mission Tales with Purefly Japan Tour (2014)
- Bullet for My Valentine European Tour (2014)
- Crossfaith European Tour (2014)
- One OK Rock 35xxxv Japan Tour (2015)
- Papa Roach United Kingdom Tour (2015)
- Bullet for My Valentine Venom European Tour (2015)
- Volumes and Northlane North American Tour (2015)
- Silverstein North American Tour (2016)
- Vans Warped North American Tour with Various Artists (2016)
- SiM The Beautiful People Japan Tour (2016)
- One Ok Rock Ambitions Japan Tour (2017)
- Crown the Empire European Tour (2018)
- The Used & Papa Roach's "Cut My Heart Into Pieces" Australian Tour (2023)
- Electric Callboy European Tour (2024)
- Electric Callboy Tanzeid Australian Tour (2026)

== Music videos ==
=== Official videos ===
List of music videos, showing director(s) and year released
Title	Year	Director(s)	Type	Album	Ref.
"Fiction"	2008	Suzuki Daishin	Narrative	Final Destination	
"8AM"	2009	Suzuki Daishin	Performance	Final Destination	
"Final Destination"	2009	Suzuki Daishin	Performance	Final Destination	
"Die Tomorrow"	2010	Suzuki Daishin	Performance	Nothing Lasts Forever	
"To Be Alive"	2011	Maxilla	Narrative	The Enemy Inside	
"Rescue Me"	2011	Maxilla	Narrative	The Enemy Inside	
"No Escape"	2012	Maxilla	Video Log	Through Clarity	
"Six Feet Under"	2012	Maxilla	Performance	Through Clarity	
"Inside of Me"	2012	Maxilla	Live Performance	Through Clarity	
"The Revelation"	2013	Maxilla	Narrative	The Revelation	
"The War Is On"	2013	Inni Vision	Performance	The Revelation	
"Behind the Curtain"	2014	Inni Vision	Live Performance	The Revelation	
"Aware and Awake"	2014	Inni Vision	Performance	Until the End	
"You Lie"	2014	Stuart Burchall	Narrative	Until the End	
"Evolve"	2015	Inni Vision	Live Performance	Until the End	
"Time Bomb"	2015	Inni Vision	Live Performance	The Revelation	
"Gone"	2015	Maxilla	Narrative	Vena	
"Wrong"	2016	Inni Vision	Performance	Vena	
"The Story"	2016	Inni Vision	Live Performance	Vena	
"Fire in the Sky"	2016	Inni Vision	Live Performance	Vena	
"Born to Bleed"	2016	Inni Vision	Narrative	Vena II	
"Envy"	2017	Maxilla	Performance	Fateless	
"R.I.P."	2017	Maxilla	Narrative	Fateless	
"Revolution"	2019	Koh Yamada	Performance	The Side Effects	
"Coexist"	2019	Takuya Oyama	Narrative	The Side Effects	
"January 1st"	2019	Koh Yamada	Performance	The Side Effects	
"The Side Effects"	2019	Inni Vision	Performance	The Side Effects	
"Mayday" (featuring Ryo Kinoshita of Crystal Lake)	2019	Inni Vision	Live Performance	The Side Effects	
"See You"	2020	Dajo Eberlei	Live Performance	The Side Effects	
"Speak"	2020	Takuya Oyama	Live Performance	The Side Effects	
"F.T.T.T"	2021	Koh Yamada	Live Performance	Fateless	
"Paradise (Kill the Silence)"	2021	Inni Vision	Performance	Nonnegative	
"Calling"	2022	Koh Yamada	Performance	Nonnegative	
"Before I Go"	2022	Inni Vision	Performance	Nonnegative	
"Cut Me"	2022	Inni Vision	Performance	Nonnegative	
"New Dawn"	2023	Koh Yamada	Performance	Non-album single	
"Vengeance"	2024	Takasuke Kato	Narrative	Final Destination (XV Re:Recorded)	
"Incomplete"	2025	Margt	Performance	Optimize	
"Chasing Shadows"	2025	Masaki Watanabe	Performance	Optimize	
"Free Fall"	2025	Seidai Takekoshi	Performance	Optimize	
"Ex-Humanity"	2026	Seidai Takekoshi	Performance	Optimize = Optdemise	

=== Live videos ===
List of live music videos, showing director(s) and year released
Title	Year	Director	Album	Ref.
"Adrenaline"	2011	Maxilla	The Enemy Inside	
"Feed the Fire"	2018	Inni Vision	Fateless	
"Bury Me"	2018	Inni Vision	Fateless	
"Runaway"	2018	Inni Vision	Vena	
"Revolution"	2020	Jiei Mogi	The Side Effects	
"Final Destination"	2020	Jiei Mogi	Final Destination	
"Paradise (Kill the Silence)"	2022	Inni Vision	Nonnegative	
"Calling"	2023	Inni Vision	Nonnegative	
"Before I Go"	2023	Inni Vision	Nonnegative	
"Vengeance"	2025	—N/a	Final Destination (XV Re:Recorded)	
