= Paradise (Kill the Silence) =

2021 song by Coldrain

Single by Coldrain

from the album Nonnegative
- Released: 17 September 2021
- Recorded: 2021
- Studio: Attic Studio Harajuku (Tokyo, Japan)
- Genre: Nu metal; post-hardcore; hard rock; alternative rock
- Length: 3:43
- Label: Warner Music
- Songwriters: Masato Hayakawa; Ryo Yokochi
- Producer: Michael Baskette

Coldrain singles chronology
"Speak" (2020)	"Paradise (Kill the Silence)" (2021)	"Calling" (2022)

Coldrain chronology
Live & Backstage at Blare Fest. 2020 (2020)	Paradise (Kill the Silence) (2021)	Nonnegative (2022)

Music video
- "Paradise (Kill the Silence)" on YouTube

"Paradise (Kill the Silence)" is a song by Japanese rock band Coldrain. It was promoted as a single but was instead released as an extended play with five other versions of the same song. This would also make it the fourth EP released by the band, their first in seven years since Until the End (2014). It was written by frontman Masato Hayakawa and lead guitarist Ryo Yokochi, and produced by Michael Baskette. It was released as the lead single from their seventh studio album Nonnegative on 17 September 2021. The track became an instant radio hit in both Japan and Germany.

On 28 January 2022, the band released an official live music video of "Paradise (Kill the Silence)" onto YouTube from their final ever live performance played at the Usen Studio Coast in Tokyo, Japan on 16 November 2021.

The band performs "Paradise (Kill the Silence)" during the Japanese TV advert for New Balance's MET24 collection, entitled "METropolitan 24 Hour Survival Game".

== Background ==
On 6 August 2021, the band teased and hinted at new material on their official Twitter account stating that they would be making an announcement 24 hours later to create excitement and hype among fans and critics alike. The following day, the band formally announced on their social media accounts that they would be releasing a new single titled "Paradise (Kill the Silence)" on 17 September 2021, as well as embarking on a nationwide tour titled "Paradise" during October and November 2021 playing at 12 venues around Japan to promote the single. The band later showcased the single "Paradise (Kill the Silence)" for the first time a couple of hours before its release on 16 September by playing it live in an exclusive premiere on the second edition of Coldrain TV. Upon release, "Paradise (Kill the Silence)" was released in an unusual format never prior done by the band as the single was released as an extended play with five different other versions of the same song which were intended for fan interaction and allow them to play along with the band and let them put their own interpretation on the song.

The release of "Paradise (Kill the Silence)" would also mark the first time the band has released new material in two years since The Side Effects (2019). The song would also be promoted in Australia on the Triple J radio station, being played on the "Short Fast Loud" segment with Josh Merriel, as well as in the UK on BBC Radio 1's "Future Alternative" segment with Nels Hylton.

== Composition and lyrics ==
"Paradise (Kill the Silence)"
A 30 second audio clip of the chorus.

"Paradise (Kill the Silence)" has been described by critics as a nu metal, post-hardcore, hard rock, and an alternative rock song. The song runs at 160 BPM and is in the key of E minor. It runs for three minutes and 43 seconds. It was written by frontman Masato Hayakawa and lead guitarist Ryo Yokochi and produced by Michael Baskette.

The song was written from the band's perspective of the world arising from the ashes after the COVID-19 pandemic. The lyrics allude to the "Paradise" being the concert halls after over a year of lockdowns, with "killing the silence" being the band starting to play live again in a live setting. "Paradise (Kill the Silence)" also tackles the themes of emotional freedom.

Speaking to V13, Hayakawa shared his thoughts about the meaning of the song at the time of its release:

"Japanese rock shows are still in the state of masks wearing and silence required to the audience. A simple song about the better days waiting ahead. The song goes crazy live."

Hayakawa later expressed how "Paradise (Kill the Silence)" was selected as the lead single, how the message of the song represents the album as a whole and why they released the single when they did:

"I think it's a song that has the momentum of a young band. So, we wanted to show that it wasn't time to settle down yet, and we dared to put out songs that we obviously can't enjoy within the rules of the corona disaster. I have hope for when the timing is right, that the restrictions will be lifted, so I wanted to put it out there in the moment where I can explode live when the time comes.

== Track listing ==
Digital EP
No.	Title	Writer(s)	Length
1.	"Paradise (Kill the Silence)"	Masato Hayakawa; Ryo Yokochi	3:43
2.	"Paradise (Kill the Silence) for Singers"	Hayakawa; Yokochi	3:43
3.	"Paradise (Kill the Silence) for Lead Guitarists"	Hayakawa; Yokochi	3:43
4.	"Paradise (Kill the Silence) for Rhythm Guitarists"	Hayakawa; Yokochi	3:43
5.	"Paradise (Kill the Silence) for Bassists"	Hayakawa; Yokochi	3:43
6.	"Paradise (Kill the Silence) for Drummers"	Hayakawa; Yokochi	3:43
Total length:			22:18

== Music video ==
A stillshot of the music video set from above with Coldrain performing on an LED stage with the lyrics "Kill the Silence" displayed on the screen beneath them.

The music video for "Paradise (Kill the Silence)" was released at midnight on 17 September 2021, only a couple of hours after the song's live premiere on the second edition of Coldrain TV. It was directed by Inni Vision. The song was initially accidentally uploaded in mono format on YouTube until the band fixed the error a few days later where the sound format was corrected and fixed into the stereo format.

The video starts off with a minute intro of the band sitting down and getting ready to perform, promoting Monster Energy through the use of product placement. The band then start to perform the song on an LED stage with high intensity with flashing lights around them as the camera has close-ups of the band members as they perform the song, intertwining it with fast camera movements to showcase the energy of the song. There are also occasional shots of the stage from a birdseye view which shows the band performing on the US Vans Warped Tour in 2016 and performing at the Nippon Budokan in 2018, as well as some lyrics of the song also showing on the LED screen. One critic also noted how the music video was akin to the music video for "Final Destination", the title track off of their 2009 album Final Destination.

== Personnel ==
Credits adapted from Tidal.

Coldrain

- Masato Hayakawa – lead vocals, lyrics, composition, arrangements
- Ryo Yokochi – lead guitar, programming, composition, arrangements
- Kazuya Sugiyama – rhythm guitar, arrangements
- Ryo Shimizu – bass guitar, arrangements
- Katsuma Minatani – drums, arrangements

Additional personnel

- Michael Baskette – producer, mixing, arrangements
- Brad Blackwood — mastering
- Daihei Yamanaka — recording engineer
- Joshua Saldate – assistant engineer

== Charts ==
=== Weekly charts ===
Weekly chart performance for "Paradise (Kill the Silence)"
Chart (2021)	Peak position
Germany Rock Airplay (GfK)	3
Japan Billboard Hot 100	14
Japan Download Songs (Billboard)	99
Japan Digital Rock (iTunes)	21

=== Year-end charts ===
Year-end chart performance for "Paradise (Kill the Silence)"
Chart (2021)	Position
Germany Rock Airplay (GfK)	17
