= The Revelation (Coldrain album) =

Studio album by Coldrain
- Released: April 17, 2013
- Recorded: December 2012 – February 2013
- Studios: House of Loud (Elmwood Park, New Jersey, US)
- Genres: Post-hardcore; metalcore; alternative metal; alternative rock; hard rock; pop punk
- Length: 35:40 (Japanese edition); 43:50 (international edition); 58:37 (Australian deluxe edition)
- Labels: VAP; Hopeless; Sony Music
- Producer: David Bendeth

Coldrain chronology
| Through Clarity (2012) | The Revelation (2013) | Evolve (2014) |

Singles from The Revelation
- 1. "The Revelation" Released: April 1, 2013; 2. "The War Is On" Released: July 25, 2013; 3. "Behind the Curtain" Released: January 15, 2014; 4. "Aware and Awake" Released: July 1, 2014; 5. "You Lie" Released: September 8, 2014; 6. "Evolve" Released: February 13, 2015; 7. "Time Bomb" Released: March 2, 2015

The Revelation is the third studio album by Japanese rock band Coldrain. Recorded at House of Loud in Elmwood Park, New Jersey with producer David Bendeth. It was released on April 17, 2013 in Japan by VAP.

The album would also later be released by Hopeless Records on June 23, 2014 in Europe and on June 24, 2014 in North America as a reissue upon being signed internationally for the first time, making The Revelation their first album to be released worldwide. The album would later be released in Australia on August 8, 2014 by Sony Music.

The Revelation is the first Coldrain album to be released worldwide by Hopeless Records, and the only album to be released in Australia as a deluxe by Sony Music. It is the third album to be released in Japan by VAP. This would be the followup to 2011's The Enemy Inside, which was the last album to be exclusively released in Japan, and the predecessor to 2015s Vena. The Revelation would be their highest charting album to date on the Oricon Albums Chart, debuting and peaking at number 7, selling over 10,000 copies in its first week. Their other albums peaking in the top 10 did not fare as well, Fateless came the closest, peaking at number 8.

The album would produce four different singles from its original Japanese track listing, with the other three released from the international edition, that would be from their 2014 Until the End extended play, which was exclusively released in Japan. The lead single, being the title track "The Revelation" that was released just over two weeks before the album's release in 2013 on April 1. The second single "The War Is On" was released three months later, while the third single "Behind the Curtain" was released in January of the following year, the last single to be released prior to their debut international release. "Aware and Awake" was released after the international release in July 2014, and was borrowed from Until the End to be placed on the international edition as well as four other tracks. "House of Cards" being the only not released on the international release, but later released as a part of the Australian deluxe. "You Lie" was later released in September, being the second single released in the new international era. The seventh and final single, "Time Bomb" was released in March 2015.

The Revelation would serve as a departure from their earlier punk rock sound from Final Destination and The Enemy Inside, which instead got heavier and was more influenced from metalcore on the album that tracks a little over 43 minutes long.

== Background ==
Following the release of the Through Clarity extended play in 2012, the band would go into the studio with David Bendeth once again to record the followup to The Enemy Inside in December 2012. The band would end up doing an exclusive acoustic Christmas performance of "Carry On" in the studio to showcase the progress of the new record. On 15 March 2013, the band announced on their social media platforms that they would release the newly titled The Revelation on 17 April, and would release the first single once they had achieved 5000 retweets on the announcement post. The title track "The Revelation" would be released as the first and lead-single from the record on the 1st of April.

Upon the band signing with Hopeless Records in April 2014, the band announced that they would re-release The Revelation with an international reissue that would be released on the 23rd and 24 June later that year in Europe and North America.

== Composition ==
The album has been described by critics as post-hardcore, metalcore, alternative metal, alternative rock, hard rock, and pop punk.

== Critical reception ==
Professional ratings
Review scores
| Source | Rating |
|---|---|
| Rock Sound | 6/10 stars |
| Ultimate Guitar | 8.3/10 |
| Metal.de | 4/10 |
| AvoMagazine | 85/100 |
| Aux Portes De Metal | 14/20 |
| Twilight Magazine | 12/15 |

The debut worldwide studio album, The Revelation, received a polarised response from critics as a whole. The positive reviews were very favourable, however the release received an amount of negative reviews as well.

The main praises for The Revelation consisted of the melodies and clean vocals by frontman Masato Hayakawa. Max Barrett of Rock Sound, who rated the album a 6/10, noted that: "With the quality to fuse a mature, melodic approach with their ear for a clean and catchy chorus ("Given Up On You"), the Nagoya-based quintet make it virtually impossible to simply sit still and listen. Chuck in the more venomous, metalcore-esque sections (the title track), not to mention the odd ripping solo ("Time Bomb"), and there’s enough variation here to formally introduce Coldrain to the world." This point was reiterated by Kersten Lison of Twilight Magazine, "The metalcore is extremely dynamic and energetic. In addition, it can convince with a pleasant note of melodic, which is extremely catchy and catchy, but without drifting into the arbitrary. This gives the sound an enormous lightness despite the genre-typical hardness, which is otherwise very rarely heard in this form ("Behind The Curtain"). Just the right thing for the summer. Almost like a pleasantly cooling summer rain."

Many of the songs were strongly praised by DJ Robintje who wrote for Avo-Magazine, who would comment on the anthem like sing-a-long "The War is On". ""The War Is On" begins with a gentle, relatively short intro. This is followed up by singing which begins slowly and then introduces soft grunts. The alternation between the vocals and the grunting has a pleasant balance. Drums and guitar are clearly present, with a strong and compelling rhythm. Despite the rather dark vocals you will immediately be in the mood to join in, which makes me want to scream along with the chorus. Certainly a song that will catch on during live performances." They would then also go on to praise the highly diverse "Time Bomb", "Time for the fifth song named "Time Bomb". This track begins with a guitar intro and some solid bass lines. The vocalist sounds more dynamic and aggressive than before, which is supported by reverbs during the rush part. The guitar plays a very important role in this track which is complemented by a very nice beat. The guitar solo later in the song is fantastic! A song with a lot of variety, which still forms a beautiful whole."

However, on a more negative review, Rasmus Peters of Metal.de would highly criticise the lack of originality on the record as a whole. "Lyrically on the paths of Bullet for My Valentine, but without getting to the choruses or kindness sits or kindness that they have or had without any doubt. Even Linkin Park, when they were still being worshipped on every conventional schoolyard, are a long way off for Coldrain. It simply lacks every spark of originality, no small of it. It doesn't help that the song material itself is solidly arranged and produced."

== Track listing ==
All lyrics written by Masato Hayakawa, all music composed by Ryo Yokochi, except where noted.

Japanese edition

| No. | Title | Writer(s) | Length |
|---|---|---|---|
| 1. | "The War Is On" | | 3:32 |
| 2. | "The Revelation" | | 4:14 |
| 3. | "Falling Forever" | | 3:18 |
| 4. | "Behind the Curtain" | | 3:17 |
| 5. | "Next to You" | | 3:56 |
| 6. | "Time Bomb" | Masato Hayakawa; Kazuya Sugiyama | 3:09 |
| 7. | "Voiceless" | | 3:18 |
| 8. | "Chasing Dreams" | | 4:15 |
| 9. | "Given Up on You" | | 3:16 |
| 10. | "Carry On" | Hayakawa; Ryo Yokochi | 3:25 |
| Total length: | | | 35:40 |

International edition
| No. | Title | Writer(s) | Length |
|---|---|---|---|
| 1. | "The War Is On" | | 3:32 |
| 2. | "The Revelation" | | 4:14 |
| 3. | "Fade Away" | | 3:44 |
| 4. | "Given Up on You" | | 3:16 |
| 5. | "Time Bomb" | | 3:06 |
| 6. | "You Lie" | Hayakawa; Yokochi | 3:42 |
| 7. | "Evolve" | Hayakawa; Yokochi | 3:35 |
| 8. | "Behind the Curtain" | | 3:17 |
| 9. | "Aware and Awake" | Hayakawa; Yokochi | 3:46 |
| 10. | "Voiceless" | | 3:18 |
| 11. | "March On" | Hayakawa; Yokochi | 4:04 |
| 12. | "Chasing Dreams" | | 4:15 |
| Total length: | | | 43:50 |

Australian Deluxe edition
| No. | Title | Writer(s) | Length |
|---|---|---|---|
| 11. | "Aware and Awake" | | 3:46 |
| 12. | "Evolve" | | 3:33 |
| 13. | "You Lie" | | 3:42 |
| 14. | "Fade Away" | | 3:42 |
| 15. | "March On" | | 4:03 |
| 16. | "House of Cards" | Hayakawa; Yokochi | 4:20 |
| Total length: | | | 58:37 |

== Personnel ==
Credits retrieved from album's liner notes.

Coldrain

- Masato David Hayakawa (マサト, Masato) – lead vocals, lyricist
- Ryo Yokochi (ヨコチ, Y.K.C.) – lead guitar, programming, keyboards, composer
- Kazuya Sugiyama (スギ, Sugi) – rhythm guitar, backing vocals
- Ryo Shimizu (リョウ, RxYxO) – bass guitar, backing vocals
- Katsuma Minatani (カツマ, Katsuma) – drums, percussion

Additional personnel

- David Bendeth – producer, mixing, arrangement
- Ted Jensen – mastering (Mastered at Sterling Sound, NYC)
- Brian Robbins – audio engineer, mixing engineer, editing
- Michael Milan – electronic programming, engineer, editing
- John Bender – engineer, vocals, vocal arrangements
- Dan Graziano – editing
- Mike Lisa – editing

Additional personnel (Australian deluxe bonus tracks)

- Coldrain – producer, arrangements (Prime Sound Studio, Tokyo)
- David Bendeth – mixing
- Brian Robbins – mixing engineer
- Osamu Nagano – instrument technician, technical engineering

== Charts ==
Chart performance for The Revelation
| Chart (2013–14) | Peak position |
|---|---|
| Australian Hitseeker Albums (ARIA) | 4 |
| Japanese Albums (Oricon) | 7 |
| Japanese Albums (Billboard) | 7 |

== Release history ==
| Region | Date | Format | Label | Ref. |
|---|---|---|---|---|
| Japan | April 17, 2013 | CD, digital download | VAP | |
| Europe | June 23, 2014 | CD, digital download | Hopeless | |
| North America | June 24, 2014 | CD, digital download | Hopeless | |
| Australia | August 8, 2014 | CD, digital download | Sony Music | |
