= Through Clarity =

EP by Coldrain
- Released: July 4, 2012
- Studio: House of Loud (Elmwood Park, New Jersey)
- Genre: Post-hardcore; metalcore; alternative metal; alternative rock
- Length: 21:25
- Label: VAP
- Producer: David Bendeth

Coldrain chronology
Three Days of Adrenaline (2011)	Through Clarity (2012)	The Revelation (2013)

Singles from Through Clarity
- 1. "No Escape" Released: May 2, 2012; 2. "Six Feet Under" Released: June 27, 2012; 3. "Inside of Me" Released: November 15, 2012

Through Clarity is the second EP by Japanese rock band Coldrain, released in Japan on July 4, 2012, and in Europe on January 27, 2014.

The lead single, "No Escape", is featured in the official Japanese trailer for Resident Evil: Raccoon City.

== Critical reception ==
Professional ratings
Review scores
Source	Rating
Rock Sound	8/10
Contact Music	4.5/5 stars
Dead Press!	7/10
Hit The Floor	6/10

The EP received mostly positive reviews from critics.

Greg Spencer of Dead Press! praised the opener, "No Escape", for its pacing and energy. "Through Clarity begins with "No Escape", which is a rip roaring beast of a track. Its frenetic pacing and unstoppable energy combined with a catchy chorus make for a fantastic beginning to the EP. It isn't the heaviest of songs, but that actually works in the band's favour as frontman Masato has a really melodic presence as a vocalist and he carries the track forward with his vocals which range from heavy screams to Jason Butler style softer intonations." He criticised the following two tracks, "Persona" and "The Future". "The next two tracks, "Persona" and "The Future", unfortunately dredge the band into a more corny and slightly lackadaisical phase of the EP. Both tracks just feel slightly forced, the latter especially feels ultra fatuous and lacks any real emotion or genuine spark. Instead, it actually seems like one of the most generic songs you could possibly hear on a rock album."

These criticisms are shot down by Nathan Mack of Contact Music, who labelled all of the tracks as 'outstanding'. He wrote, "A personal favourite on this mini-album would be "Never Look Away". Beginning with delicate vocals and a soft intricate riff, it lulls us into a false feeling that we're soon to be given a break from with the subsequent torrential onslaught. Yet, the track rises in volume and intensity before reaching a crescendo with the first chorus, retaining momentum until the very end."

While generally praised by Rock Sound, it slammed the lyrics of frontman Masato Hayakawa. Leading it as the main problem with Through Clarity. "Sure, the lyrics are a bit crap (such is the problem with language barriers in heavy music), but if you can overlook that, Coldrain have enough ideas and intricacies on Through Clarity to really start something big."

Matt Borucki of Hit the Floor, compared the sound on the EP to that of a metalcore titanic band. "From the moment "No Escape" kicks in, it screams of early Bullet for My Valentine. In fact, so does much of the album."

== Track listing ==
All lyrics are written by Masato Hayakawa; all music is composed by Masato Hayakwa and Ryo Yokochi, except where noted

No.	Title	Writer(s)	Length
1.	"No Escape"		3:08
2.	"Persona"	Masato Hayakawa	3:21
3.	"The Future"	Hayakawa; Kazuya Sugiyama	3:30
4.	"Six Feet Under"		3:39
5.	"Never Look Away"		3:41
6.	"Inside of Me"	Hayakawa; Sugiyama	4:06
Total length:			21:25

== Personnel ==
- Masato David Hayakawa (マサト, Masato) – lead vocals
- Ryo Yokochi (ヨコチ, Y.K.C.) – lead guitar
- Kazuya Sugiyama (スギ, Sugi) – rhythm guitar, backing vocals
- Ryo Shimizu (リョウ, RxYxO) – bass guitar, backing vocals
- Katsuma Minatani (カツマ, Katsuma) – drums

== Charts ==
Chart (2012)	Peak position
Japanese Albums (Oricon)	14
Japanese Albums (Billboard)	13

== Release history ==
Region	Date	Format	Label
Japan	July 4, 2012	CD, digital download	VAP
Europe	January 27, 2014	CD, digital download	VAP
