= Until the End (EP) =

EP by Coldrain
- Released: 18 June 2014
- Recorded: January 2014
- Studios: Prime Sound Studio (Tokyo, Japan)
- Genres: Post-hardcore; metalcore; alternative metal
- Length: 23:15
- Labels: VAP; Sony Music
- Producers: Masato Hayakawa; Ryo Yokochi

Coldrain chronology
Evolve (2014)	Until the End (2014)	Vena (2015)

Singles from Until the End
- 1. "Aware and Awake" Released: 1 July 2014; 2. "You Lie" Released: 8 September 2014; 3. "Evolve" Released: 13 February 2015

Until the End is the third EP by Japanese rock band Coldrain. Recorded at Prime Sound Studio in Tokyo, Japan; it was self-produced by the band's lead vocalist Masato Hayakawa and lead guitarist Ryo Yokochi, being the band's final EP released by VAP on 18 June 2014.

In April 2014, the band signed to independent North American label Hopeless Records where they reissued their third studio album The Revelation (2013) for the first time; with five out of the six songs from Until the End being included in the international edition of the album a week after the release of the EP in Japan. In August, the entire EP was later packaged into an exclusive Australian deluxe of The Revelation, being the band's only international major label release on Sony Music Australia throughout Oceania.

Following the Japanese release of Until the End, the EP was succeeded by three singles: the lead single "Aware and Awake" was premiered via Loudwire on 1 July, the second single "You Lie" was released on 8 September accompanying a music video featuring Inception (2010) actor Mark Fleischmann in the lead role, while the third and final single "Evolve" dropped on 13 February 2015.

After eleven years, the band eventually digitally released Until the End worldwide for the first time on 24 October 2025, being distributed on the same day as the release of their next full follow-up EP Optimize.

== Track listing ==
All lyrics are written by Masato Hayakawa; all music is composed by Masato Hayakawa and Ryo Yokochi.

Until the End track listing
No.	Title	Length
1.	"Aware and Awake"	3:47
2.	"Evolve"	3:33
3.	"You Lie"	3:42
4.	"Fade Away"	3:44
5.	"March On"	4:04
6.	"House of Cards"	4:21
Total length:		23:15

== Personnel ==
Credits retrieved from EP's liner notes.

Coldrain

- Masato David Hayakawa (マサト, Masato) – lead vocals, composition, lyricist, production
- Ryo Yokochi (ヨコチ, Y.K.C.) – lead guitar, programming, keyboards, composition, production
- Kazuya Sugiyama (スギ, Sugi) – rhythm guitar, backing vocals
- Ryo Shimizu (リョウ, RxYxO) – bass guitar, backing vocals
- Katsuma Minatani (カツマ, Katsuma) – drums, percussion

Additional personnel

- David Bendeth – mixing (House of Loud, Elmwood Park, New Jersey)
- Ted Jensen – mastering (Sterling Sound, NYC)
- Osamu Nagano – instrument tech
- Brian Robbins – engineering, mix engineering, editing

== Charts ==
Chart performance for Until the End
Chart (2014)	Peak position
Australian Hitseeker Albums (ARIA)	4
Japanese Albums (Oricon)	17
Japanese Top Albums Sales (Billboard)	15

== Release history ==
Release history and formats for Until the End
Region	Date	Format	Label	Ref.
Japan	18 June 2014	CD; digital download	VAP	
Oceania (Note: Until the End was entirely bundled together with their third studio album for the Australian deluxe edition of The Revelation (2013).)	8 August 2014	CD; digital download	Sony Music Australia	
Worldwide	24 October 2025	Digital download; streaming	VAP	
