= Nothing Lasts Forever (Coldrain EP) =

EP by Coldrain
- Released: June 23, 2010
- Recorded: March – April 2010
- Studio: Sound Crew Studio (Tokyo, Japan)
- Genre: Post-hardcore; alternative rock; alternative metal; metalcore
- Length: 21:35
- Label: VAP
- Producer: Masato Hayakawa; Ryo Yokochi

Coldrain chronology
Final Destination (2009)	Nothing Lasts Forever (2010)	The Enemy Inside (2011)

Singles from Nothing Lasts Forever
- 1. "Die Tomorrow" Released: June 15, 2010

Nothing Lasts Forever is the first EP by Japanese rock band Coldrain. Recorded at Sound Crew Studio in Tokyo, Japan, which was self-produced by band members Masato Hayakawa and Ryo Yokochi. It was released on June 23, 2010 by VAP.

Nothing Lasts Forever was exclusively released in Japan, being released 9 months after their debut studio album Final Destination. Nothing Lasts Forever would end up entering and debuting at number 63 on the Oricon Albums Chart, while staying on the charts for the following three weeks.

The lead single "Die Tomorrow" was released just over a week before the release of Nothing Lasts Forever on 15 June, which would introduce the band to worldwide audiences for the first time after being included in the soundtrack for Pro Evolution Soccer 2011.

While not a single, "We're Not Alone" would end up being selected as the opening theme for the anime, Rainbow: Nisha Rokubō no Shichinin.

== Musical style ==
Nothing Lasts Forever has been stylistically described by critics as post-hardcore, alternative metal, alternative rock and metalcore.

== Track listing ==
All lyrics are written by Masato Hayakawa (except for "Stuck", written by Stacie Orrico); all music is composed by Masato Hayakawa and Ryo Yokochi, except where noted.

No.	Title	Writer(s)	Length
1.	"Die Tomorrow"	Masato Hayakawa	3:06
2.	"We're Not Alone"	Ryo Yokochi	3:58
3.	"Stuck" (Stacie Orrico cover)	Stacie Orrico; Kevin Kadish	3:28
4.	"After Dark"		3:37
5.	"The Youth"		3:28
6.	"Miss You"	Hayakawa; Kazuya Sugiyama	3:58
Total length:			21:35

== Personnel ==
Credits retrieved from EP's liner notes.

Coldrain

- Masato David Hayakawa (マサト, Masato) – lead vocals, producer
- Ryo Yokochi (ヨコチ, Y.K.C.) – lead guitar, producer
- Kazuya Sugiyama (スギ, Sugi) – rhythm guitar, backing vocals
- Ryo Shimizu (リョウ, RxYxO) – bass guitar, backing vocals
- Katsuma Minatani (カツマ, Katsuma) – drums

Additional personnel

- Satoshi Hosoi – recording engineer, mixing
- Yoichi Imaizumi – assistant engineer
- Hiromichi Takiguchi – mastering (Parasight Mastering, Tokyo)
- Daichi Takahashi – instrument technician
- Yoshio Arimatsu – drum technician

== Charts ==
Chart (2010)	Peak position
Japanese Albums (Oricon)	63
Japanese Albums (Billboard)	49
