= The Enemy Inside (Coldrain album) =

Studio album by Coldrain
- Released: February 16, 2011
- Recorded: September – November 2010
- Studios: Innig Recording Hostelry (Fujisawa, Japan)
- Genres: Post-hardcore; punk rock; alternative rock; alternative metal; screamo
- Length: 37:03
- Label: VAP
- Producers: Masato Hayakawa; Ryo Yokochi

Coldrain chronology
Nothing Lasts Forever (2010)	The Enemy Inside (2011)	Three Days of Adrenaline (2011)

Singles from The Enemy Inside
- 1. "To Be Alive" Released: February 2, 2011; 2. "Rescue Me" Released: March 10, 2011

The Enemy Inside is the second studio album by Japanese rock band Coldrain. Recorded at Innig Recording Hostelry in Fujisawa, Japan, which was self-produced by Masato Hayakawa and Ryo Yokochi, it was released on February 16, 2011, by VAP.

The Enemy Inside was exclusively released in Japan, along with their debut studio outing Final Destination, which was released two years prior. The Enemy Inside debuted at number 21 on the Oricon Albums Chart, charting for the following 5 weeks before dropping out of the charts completely.

The album would spawn singles such as the lead single, "To Be Alive", which would be released at the start of February, two weeks preceding the release of The Enemy Inside. "Rescue Me", the second and last single on the album was released on the 10th of the following month.

This would become the first release by the band to feature a different vocalist on one of their tracks for the first time. Manabu Taniguchi, known by his stage name Mah from Japanese ska-punk band SiM, would feature on "The Maze" on the record which would track a little over 37 minutes.

== Musical style ==
The Enemy Inside has been stylistically described as being post-hardcore, punk rock, alternative rock, alternative metal and screamo.

== Track listing ==
All lyrics are written by Masato Hayakawa; all music is composed by Masato Hayakawa and Ryo Yokochi, except where noted.

No.	Title	Writer(s)	Length
1.	"To Be Alive"		3:19
2.	"New Fate"	Masato Hayakawa; Kazuya Sugiyama	3:09
3.	"Rescue Me"		3:29
4.	"Adrenaline"		3:30
5.	"You"		4:32
6.	"The Maze" (featuring Mah of SiM)		3:24
7.	"Rise and Fall"	Hayakawa	3:26
8.	"Confession"	Hayakawa; Sugiyama	4:17
9.	"A Tragic Instinct"		3:38
10.	"Hollow"	Hayakawa	4:19
Total length:			37:03

== Personnel ==
Credits retrieved from album's liner notes.

Coldrain

- Masato David Hayakawa (マサト, Masato) – lead vocals, producer
- Ryo Yokochi (ヨコチ, Y.K.C.) – lead guitar, producer
- Kazuya Sugiyama (スギ, Sugi) – rhythm guitar, backing vocals
- Ryo Shimizu (リョウ, RxYxO) – bass guitar, backing vocals
- Katsuma Minatani (カツマ, Katsuma) – drums

Guest feature

- Manabu Taniguchi (まぁ, Mah) of SiM – guest vocals on "The Maze"

Additional personnel

- Satoshi Hosoi – recording engineer, mixing
- Yoichi Imaizumi – assistant engineer
- Hiromichi Takiguchi – mastering (Parasight Mastering, Tokyo)
- Daichi Takahashi – instrument technician
- Jun Yamada – instrument technician

== Charts ==
Chart (2011)	Peak position
Japanese Albums (Oricon)	21
Japanese Albums (Billboard)	22
