= Nonnegative (album) =

Studio album by Coldrain
- Released: July 6, 2022
- Recorded: January 29–March 18, 2022
- Studios: Studio Barbarosa (Orlando, Florida, U.S.)
- Genres: Post-hardcore; metalcore; alternative metal; alternative rock; hard rock
- Length: 45:19
- Label: Warner Music Japan
- Producer: Michael Baskette

Coldrain chronology
Paradise (Kill the Silence) (2021)	Nonnegative (2022)	15x(5+U) Live at Yokohama Arena (2023)

Singles from Nonnegative
- 1. "Paradise (Kill the Silence)" Released: September 17, 2021; 2. "Calling" Released: April 17, 2022; 3. "Before I Go" Released: June 8, 2022; 4. "Bloody Power Fame" Released: June 30, 2022; 5. "Cut Me" Released: July 6, 2022

Nonnegative is the seventh studio album by Japanese rock band Coldrain. Recorded at Studio Barbarosa in Orlando, Florida with producer Michael 'Elvis' Baskette (who previously produced the band's predecessors, Fateless and The Side Effects), it was released on July 6, 2022, by Warner Music Japan.

Nonnegative is the third album by the band to be released by Warner Music and is the follow-up to 2019's The Side Effects. It was formally announced during the band's fifteenth anniversary live stream and was preceded by five singles. The album's lead single "Paradise (Kill the Silence)" was released on September 17, 2021, the second single "Calling" was released concurrently on the band's fifteenth anniversary on April 17, 2022, the third and fourth singles "Before I Go" and "Bloody Power Fame" were both released in June, the former being promoted as the campaign song for Sapporo Breweries latest product "Sapporo Beer Gold Star" while the latter was used as the opening theme for the Netflix anime Bastard!!. The fifth single "Cut Me" was dropped with an accompanying music video alongside the album in July 2022. The band released a total of twelve songs on the album, including a cover of No Doubt's 1996 smash hit "Don't Speak" on a record that spans a total runtime of just over 45 minutes.

== Composition ==
Nonnegative has been described by critics as post-hardcore, metalcore, alternative metal, alternative rock, hard rock, electronic rock, and pop punk.

== Track listing ==
All lyrics written by Masato Hayakawa, all music composed by Masato Hayakawa and Ryo Yokochi, except when noted.

Nonnegative track listing
No.	Title	Writer(s)	Length
1.	"Help Me Help You"		3:43
2.	"Calling"		3:27
3.	"Cut Me"		3:23
4.	"Before I Go"		4:06
5.	"Bloody Power Fame"		3:58
6.	"Here with You"		3:19
7.	"Boys and Girls"		4:09
8.	"Paradise (Kill the Silence)"		3:43
9.	"2020"		4:01
10.	"Rabbit Hole"		3:42
11.	"Don't Speak" (No Doubt cover)	Gwen Stefani; Eric Stefani	3:50
12.	"From Today"		3:53
Total length:			45:19

Last Live at Studio Coast deluxe edition
No.	Title	Original album	Length
1.	"Behind the Curtain"	The Revelation	3:18
2.	"Time Bomb"	The Revelation	3:46
3.	"Mayday"	The Side Effects	3:53
4.	"Fire in the Sky"	Vena	5:12
5.	"Persona"	Through Clarity	3:23
6.	"Runaway"	Vena	7:07
7.	"Evolve"	Until the End	3:24
8.	"Feed the Fire"	Fateless	4:23
9.	"F.T.T.T."	Fateless	3:51
10.	"Adrenaline"	The Enemy Inside	4:23
11.	"January 1st"	The Side Effects	9:24
12.	"Déjà Vu"	Final Destination	5:23
13.	"Uninvited"	Fateless	4:47
14.	"24-7"	Final Destination	3:57
15.	"Die Tomorrow"	Nothing Lasts Forever	3:12
16.	"To Be Alive"	The Enemy Inside	3:29
17.	"Gone"	Vena	5:45
18.	"No Escape"	Through Clarity	3:22
19.	"The Revelation"	The Revelation	4:03
20.	"Envy"	Fateless	5:29
21.	"Revolution"	The Side Effects	5:32
22.	"The Side Effects"	The Side Effects	4:52
23.	"Paradise (Kill the Silence)"	Nonnegative	6:04
24.	"Final Destination"	Final Destination	4:13
Total length:			112:52

== Personnel ==
Credits adapted from album's liner notes.

Coldrain

- Masato David Hayakawa (マサト, Masato) – lead vocals, composer, lyricist, arrangements, album artwork and design
- Ryo Yokochi (ヨコチ, Y.K.C.) – lead guitar, programming, composer, arrangements
- Kazuya Sugiyama (スギ, Sugi) – rhythm guitar, backing vocals, arrangements
- Ryo Shimizu (リョウ, RxYxO) – bass guitar, backing vocals, arrangements
- Katsuma Minatani (カツマ, Katsuma) – drums, percussion, arrangements

Additional personnel

- Michael Baskette – producer, mixing, arrangements
- Brad Blackwood — mastering (Euphonic Masters, Memphis, Tennessee)
- Jef Moll – recording engineer
- Daihei Yamanaka — recording engineer (Sakura Studio and Attic Studio Harajuku) (5, 8)
- Joshua Saldate – assistant engineer
- Kentaro Tanaka – A&R
- Akihito Miyakoshi – A&R assistant
- Hikaru Ogasawara – sales promotor
- Manabu Okamoto – digital planner
- Tadahi Matsuyama – package coordination
- Satoshi Kyojoh – general manager
- Tatsuro Watanabe – chief manager
- Kazuki Ozawa – artist manager
- Mai Sakamoto – desk
- Haruta – photography

== Charts ==
=== Weekly charts ===
Weekly chart performance for Nonnegative
Chart (2022)	Peak position
Japanese Albums (Oricon)	15
Japanese Combined Albums (Oricon)	15
Japanese Digital Albums (Oricon)	7
Japanese Rock Albums (Oricon)	3
Japanese Hot Albums (Billboard)	12
Japanese Top Album Sales (Billboard)	11
Japanese Digital Albums (Billboard)	5

=== Monthly charts ===
Monthly chart performance for Nonnegative
Chart (2022)	Peak position
Japanese Albums (Oricon)	47
Japanese Rock Albums (Oricon)	4
