= Optimize = Optdemise =

Studio album by Coldrain
- Released: 25 September 2026
- Recorded: 2024–2026
- Studios: Fennel Studio (Tokyo, Japan); Bazooka Studio (Tokyo, Japan); aLIVE Recording Studio (Tokyo, Japan)
- Length: 41:43
- Languages: English; Japanese
- Labels: Sony Music; Century Media
- Producer: Ryo Yokochi

Coldrain chronology
Optimize (2025)	Optimize = Optdemise (2026)

Singles from Optdemise
- 1. "Ex-Humanity" Released: 17 July 2026; 2. "Poison" Released: 28 August 2026

Optimize = Optdemise (stylised in all caps) is the eighth studio album by Japanese rock band Coldrain. Self-produced by the band's lead guitarist Ryo Yokochi, it was released on 25 September 2026. It is the band's first studio album on Century Media Records and Sony Music Japan after leaving longtime label Warner Music Japan.

Optimize = Optdemise is the band's first studio album in four years since their seventh studio album Nonnegative (2022), serving as the longest gap between albums in the band's history. It is the band's first album to be rolled out internationally since their fourth studio album Vena (2015), and the first to hold self-production credits since their second studio album The Enemy Inside (2011). It is also the first album by the band to include Japanese lyrics that are briefly heard in the third minute on the album's second track "Chasing Shadows".

The album acts as a sequel record to the band's fifth EP Optimize (2025), of which all of the EP's five tracks are included as the first physical disc of the album. The sequel Optdemise is a seven-track record of the album's second physical disc packaged together with the EP to create a twelve track double album titled Optimize = Optdemise. The concept of the themes of retaining humanity in a world being further consumed by technology and artificial intelligence creates an overarching narrative that serves as the band's first ever attempt at a concept album.

Optdemise was preceded by two singles; the lead single "Ex-Humanity" was released alongside the album's reveal on 17 July 2026, while the second single "Poison" features Bert McCracken, the frontman from American rock band The Used, which dropped on 28 August. The album also features Crossfaith vocalist Kenta Koie on the album's final track "Savior". Tracking at a little over 41 minutes, the album received positive reviews by critics.

== Track listing ==
All lyrics written by Masato Hayakawa, all music composed by Masato Hayakawa and Ryo Yokochi, except when noted.

Disc one – Optimize track listing
No.	Title	Length
1.	"Optimize"	3:57
2.	"Chasing Shadows"	3:47
3.	"Digitoll"	3:24
4.	"Incomplete"	3:35
5.	"Free Fall"	3:29
Total length:		18:13

Disc two – Optdemise track listing
No.	Title	Writer(s)	Length
1.	"Ex-Humanity"		3:12
2.	"Rest of Me"		3:04
3.	"Poison" (featuring Bert McCracken)	Masato Hayakawa; Bert McCracken; Ryo Yokochi	3:35
4.	"G.I.A.I.G" (Give It All I Got)		3:11
5.	"Sing"		3:29
6.	"Picture Perfect Hell"		3:17
7.	"Savior" (featuring Kenta Koie)	Hayakawa; Yokochi; Kenta Koie	3:40
Total length:			23:30 (41:43)

Live at Blare Fest 2026 limited edition
No.	Title	Original album	Length
1.	"Free Fall" (Day 1)	Optimize	5:35
2.	"Paradise (Kill the Silence)" (Day 1)	Nonnegative	3:52
3.	"Adrenaline" (Day 1)	The Enemy Inside	4:07
4.	"Vena" (Day 1)	Vena	1:25
5.	"Fire in the Sky" (Day 1)	Vena	3:30
6.	"Digitoll" (Day 1)	Optimize	3:30
7.	"Vengeance" (Day 1)	Final Destination (XV Re:Recorded)	4:43
8.	"New Dawn" (Day 2)	Non album single	6:32
9.	"Incomplete" (Day 2)	Optimize	4:00
10.	"Envy" (Day 2)	Fateless	4:33
11.	"Cut Me" (Day 2)	Nonnegative	4:16
12.	"The Side Effects" (Day 2)	The Side Effects	4:08
13.	"Chasing Shadows" (Day 2)	Optimize	4:50
14.	"Optimize" (Day 2)	Optimize	5:39
15.	"Final Destination" (Day 2)	Final Destination	4:52
Total length:			65:42

Notes

- All track titles are stylised in all caps.
- The international physical version of "Chasing Shadows" omits the Japanese lyrics.

== Personnel ==
Credits adapted from the album's liner notes and Tidal.

Coldrain

- Masato David Hayakawa (マサト, Masato) – lead vocals, composition, lyrics, arrangements
- Ryo Yokochi (ヨコチ, Y.K.C.) – lead guitar, composition, programming, production, engineering, arrangements
- Kazuya Sugiyama (スギ, Sugi) – rhythm guitar, backing vocals, arrangements
- Ryo Shimizu (リョウ, RxYxO) – bass guitar, backing vocals, arrangements
- Katsuma Minatani (カツマ, Katsuma) – drums, percussion, arrangements

Additional musicians

- Bert McCracken – vocals, lyrics (8) (ASCND Studios, Sydney, New South Wales, Australia)
- Kenta Koie (ケンタ, Kenta) – vocals, lyrics (12)

Additional personnel

- Sam Guaiana – mixing
- Mike Kalajian – mastering (Rogue Planet Mastering, Gardiner, New York, US)
- Steven McNair – engineering
- Ingrid Oram – engineering (8) (ASCND Studios, Sydney, New South Wales, Australia)
- Greg Stace – engineering (8) (ASCND Studios, Sydney, New South Wales, Australia)
- Ryo Trackmaker – engineering

== Charts ==
=== Weekly charts ===
Weekly chart performance for Optimize = Optdemise
Chart (2026)	Peak position
Japanese Albums (Oricon)	14
Japanese Combined Albums (Oricon)	20
Japanese Rock Albums (Oricon)	1
Japanese Download Albums (Billboard)	12
Japanese Top Album Sales (Billboard)	13
North American Heavy Albums (NACC)	10

=== Monthly charts ===
Monthly chart performance for Optimize = Optdemise
Chart (2026)	Peak position
Japanese Rock Albums (Oricon)	8

== Release history ==
Release history and formats for Optimize = Optdemise
Region	Date	Format	Label	Ref.
Japan	25 September 2026	CD; LP; Digital download; streaming	Sony Music	
Europe; North America	25 September 2026	CD; LP; Digital download; streaming	Century Media	
Australia	2 October 2026	CD; LP	Century Media	
