= Optimize (EP) =

EP by Coldrain
- Released: 24 October 2025
- Recorded: 2024–25
- Studios: Fennel Studio (Tokyo, Japan); Bazooka Studio (Tokyo, Japan); aLIVE Recording Studio (Tokyo, Japan)
- Genres: Post-hardcore; metalcore; nu metal; alternative metal; alternative rock; hard rock; electronic rock; pop rock
- Length: 18:13
- Languages: English; Japanese
- Labels: Sony Music Japan; Century Media
- Producer: Ryo Yokochi

Coldrain chronology
Homecoming Live at Nippon Gaishi Hall (2025)	Optimize (2025)	Optimize = Optdemise (2026)

Singles from Optimize
- 1. "Incomplete" Released: 20 March 2025; 2. "Chasing Shadows" Released: 6 August 2025; 3. "Free Fall" Released: 26 September 2025

Optimize (stylised in all caps) is the fifth EP by Japanese rock band Coldrain. Self-produced by the band's lead guitarist Ryo Yokochi, it was released on 24 October 2025. It is the band's first release on Century Media Records and Sony Music Japan after leaving longtime label Warner Music Japan.

While it's the band's first EP in four years since the lead single "Paradise (Kill the Silence)" (2021) from the band's seventh studio album Nonnegative (2022) was released as such; it is the band's first full proper EP in eleven years since Japanese exclusive Until the End (2014), marking Optimize as the band's first EP to be released worldwide upon release and the first release by the band to be fully rolled out internationally since their fourth studio album Vena (2015).

The EP was preceded by three singles; the lead single "Incomplete" on 20 March, acting as the first ever thing the band released on their new label, the second single "Chasing Shadows" was released on 6 August, while the EP's third and final single "Free Fall" was released on 26 September. Optimize received positive reviews by critics, and has been promoted by a World Tour that began in September 2025, concluding in December of the same year.

Optimize serves as the longest ever gap between releases of original material from the band, while at five tracks, it is the band's shortest EP to date, tracking at a little over 18 minutes with a digital-only release. The EP has a full-album sequel, Optimize = Optdemise, which released on 25 September 2026, including all the EP's five songs.

== Background ==
On 18 March 2025, the band announced that they had left long-time label Warner Music Japan and had put pen-to-paper on a contract with German based label Century Media Records on an international deal, while signing with Sony Music in their home country. Simultaneously, the band teased the lead single "Incomplete" before its release on 20 March as the band's debut single on their new labels. On 27 March, the music video for "Incomplete" was released alongside additionally announced German tour dates for August. On 4 April, the band announced a fullscale European headline tour, kicking off in Manchester, England on 22 November and culminating in Frankfurt, Germany on 13 December, the tour spans across 16 cities, including the band's first UK dates in six years, alongside their debut concert in Hungary. On 11 July, the band formally announced their fifth EP Optimize, scheduled for release during an unspecifed time in the autumn. The band simultaneously announced a One Man Tour across Japan to promote the release. On 6 August, the band surprise released the EP's second single "Chasing Shadows"." On 9 September, the band announced that the EP would be scheduled to release on 24 October. On 26 September, the band released the EP's third single "Free Fall". On 22 September, the band uploaded a teaser trailer for Optimize to their social media accounts.

== Composition ==
The EP has been described by critics as post-hardcore, metalcore, nu metal, alternative metal, alternative rock, hard rock, electronic rock, and pop rock.

== Track listing ==
All lyrics written by Masato Hayakawa, all music composed by Masato Hayakawa and Ryo Yokochi.

Optimize track listing
No.	Title	Length
1.	"Optimize"	3:57
2.	"Chasing Shadows"	3:47
3.	"Digitoll"	3:24
4.	"Incomplete"	3:35
5.	"Free Fall"	3:29
Total length:		18:13

Notes

- All track titles are stylised in all caps.

== Personnel ==
Credits adapted from the album's liner notes. (Note: The credits for Optimize were adapted from its full-length followup studio album Optimize = Optdemise (2026) that contains the EP's five songs.)

Coldrain

- Masato David Hayakawa (マサト, Masato) – lead vocals, composition, lyrics
- Ryo Yokochi (ヨコチ, Y.K.C.) – lead guitar, composition, production, engineering
- Kazuya Sugiyama (スギ, Sugi) – rhythm guitar, backing vocals
- Ryo Shimizu (リョウ, RxYxO) – bass guitar, backing vocals
- Katsuma Minatani (カツマ, Katsuma) – drums, percussion

Additional personnel

- Sam Guaiana – mixing
- Mike Kalajian – mastering (Rogue Planet Mastering, Gardiner, New York, US)
- Steven McNair – engineering
- Ryo Trackmaker – engineering

== Charts ==
Chart performance for Optimize
Chart (2025)	Peak position
Japanese Digital Albums (Oricon)	13
Japan Download Songs (Billboard)	80

== Release history ==
Release history and formats for Optimize
Region	Date	Format	Label	Ref.
Worldwide	24 October 2025	Digital download; streaming	Sony Music; Century Media	
Worldwide	25 September 2026 (Note: Optimize was added and released physically as apart of the band's eighth studio album Optimize = Optdemise (2026).)	CD; LP	Sony Music; Century Media	
