= Tasuku Nagase =

Japanese actor from Tottori Prefecture (born 1993)

Tusk
- タスク
- Born: Tasuku Adachi (足立 匡, Adachi Tasuku); January 22, 1993 (age 33); Tottori Prefecture, Japan
- Other names: Tasuku Nagase (永瀬 匡, Nagase Tasuku); Task (匡, Tasuku); The Empty Orchestra (stylized in all caps)
- Occupations: Actor; Model; Musician
- Years active: 2007–2010, 2011–present
- Agent: Hitome
- Height: 176 cm (5 ft 9 in)
- Spouse: Lyla Iwamoto (m. 2018)
- Children: 2

Tusk (タスク, Tasuku; born January 22, 1993) (stylized in all caps) is a Japanese actor, model, and musician from Tottori Prefecture.

== Career ==
In 2007, Nagase started his career as a Kansai Johnny's Jr. under Johnny & Associates, with which he was associated until 2010. He was a member of the Johnny's Jr. unit "Ossan" from 2007 to 2008. In 2011, he debuted as an actor under Ken-On, with which he was associated until August 2018. He worked as freelance from September 1, 2018. He is under Hitome from April 2021.

== Filmography ==
=== TV series ===
Year	Title	Role	Network	Notes
2011	Ouran High School Host Club	Akira Komatsuzawa	TBS	2 episodes
2011	Kaitō Royale	Ryota Kosugi	TBS	
2012	Renai Neet: Wasureta Koi no Hajimekata	Takuya Yamada	TBS	
2012	Hōkago wa Mystery to Tomo ni	Shunsuke Adachi	TBS	
2013	Kamen Rider Wizard	Kosuke Nito/ Kamen Rider Beast	TV Asahi	
2013	Yae no Sakura	Eijirou Aoki	NHK	Taiga drama
2015	High & Low: The Story of S.W.O.R.D.	Shion	NTV	
2017	Beppinsan	Ichirō Saijō	NHK	Asadora
2018	Ossan's Love	Tatsumi Kenzaki	TV Asahi	Episode: "Can you "Coming Out"?"
2018	Kamen Rider Zi-O	Kosuke Nito/Kamen Rider Beast	TV Asahi	Episode 7-8

=== Film ===
Year	Title	Role	Network	Notes
2012	Lesson of the Evil	Shuhei Naruse	Toho	
2012	Kamen Rider × Kamen Rider Wizard & Fourze: Movie War Ultimatum	Kamen Rider Beast (voice)	Toei	
2013	Yuda	Daisuke	Is.Field	
2013	Kamen Rider × Super Sentai × Space Sheriff: Super Hero Taisen Z	Kosuke Nito / Kamen Rider Beast	Toei	
2013	Kamen Rider Wizard in Magic Land	Kosuke Nito / Kamen Rider Beast	Toei	
2013	Kamen Rider × Kamen Rider Gaim & Wizard: The Fateful Sengoku Movie Battle	Kosuke Nito / Kamen Rider Beast	Toei	
2014	Say "I love you"	Kenji Nakanishi	Shochiku	
2015	Yabureta Heart o Urimono ni	Atami Detective Boy	Media Factory	
2015	Zutaboro	Koichi Itaya	Toei	Lead role
2015	The Big Bee	Kamijo	Shochiku	
2015	Mr. Max Man	Fumio Nishijima	Katsu-do	
2016	Road to High & Low	Shion	Shochiku	
2016	High & Low: The Movie	Shion	Shochiku	
2016	Cutie Honey: Tears	Ryuta Kimura	Toei	
2016	Ranmaru: The Man with the God Tongue	Makoto Uranai	Shochiku	
2019	Inemuri Iwane			

=== Music videos ===
Year	Title	Album	Artist	Ref.
2019	"Coexist"	The Side Effects	Coldrain	
