= Fire Force season 1 =

2019 season of anime television series

Fire Force
- Season 1
- Cover art for the first home media volume of the season, featuring Shinra Kusakabe (F) and Arthur Boyle (B)
- No. of episodes: 24

Release
- Original network: JNN (MBS, TBS)
- Original release: July 6 – December 28, 2019

Season chronology
- Next → Season 2

The first season of the Fire Force anime television series is based on the manga series Fire Force by Atsushi Ohkubo. The season was produced by David Production and directed by Yuki Yase. Yamato Haijima handled the scripts, Hideyuki Morioka designed the characters, and Kenichiro Suehiro composed the music. It aired from July 6 to December 28, 2019, on the Super Animeism programming block on all JNN affiliates, including its flagship stations MBS and TBS. (Note: MBS and TBS listed the series premiere as airing on July 5 at 25:25, which is effectively July 6 at 1:25 a.m. JST.)

The first opening theme song is "Inferno" (インフェルノ), performed by Mrs. Green Apple, while the first ending theme song is "Veil", performed by Keina Suda. The second opening theme song is "Mayday", performed by Coldrain featuring Ryo from Crystal Lake, while the second ending theme song is "Nо̄nai" (脳内, lit. 'Inside the Brain'), performed by Lenny Code Fiction.

== Episodes ==
No. overall	No. in season	Title	Directed by	Written by	Storyboarded by	Original release date	English air date
1	1	"Shinra Kusakabe Enlists"; Transliteration: "Shinra Kusakabe, Nyūtai" (Japanese: 森羅 日下部、入隊)	Yuki Yase	Yamato Haijima	Yuki Yase	July 6, 2019	July 28, 2019
In a train station, a passenger spontaneously combusts in a cart. The Special Fire Force Company 8, a specialized fire brigade consisting of members with pyrokinetic abilities, is called in to assist. The brigades purpose is to "lay to rest" Infernals, fiery beasts that materialize from human bodies. As if in a religious ceremony, the company prays for the soul of the Infernal in the train while they fight it, before destroying it with their powers, concluding the prayer. Shinra Kusakabe, a youth dubbed "Devil's Footprints" due to his power to ignite his feet at will, witnesses the incident, and saves Iris, one of the fire fighters, from falling debris with his speed. He explains to them that he is the new recruit for Company 8. Shinra is quickly dispatched on his first mission to save the wife of a factory owner that has infernalized. In the midst of the emergency, he recalls an incident in his youth, in which he was accused of causing the fire that destroyed his home, killing his family, causing him to be feared and neglected, as well as leaving him with the desire to become a hero and save people. Shinra successfully destroys the Infernal, as him and the other Company members honor her memory. Outside, he is greeted by the husband of the woman, who tearfully thanks him for ending his wife's suffering.
2	2	"The Heart of a Fire Soldier"; Transliteration: "Shōbō-kan no Kokoro" (Japanese: 消防官の心)	Shuntarō Tozawa	Yoriko Tomita & Yamato Haijima	Hiroko Kazui	July 13, 2019	August 4, 2019
Shinra is told about the upcoming Rookie Fire Soldier Games and how he and the new recruit, Arthur Boyle, will represent Special Fire Force Company 8. Shinra explains that he knows Arthur from the Academy, and is heavily annoyed by his tendency of considering himself a king, and acting like so. Lieutenant Hinawa orders Maki to test their abilities before the game. She easily defeats them with her strength and fire inhibiting abilities, as they are overconfident as third-generation pyrokinetics. Suddenly, the company receives an emergency call of an Infernal in a detached house in the Iriya District. When they arrive, Arthur and Shinra both draw their weapons in public against the Captain's orders, an act he says can distress people, who see the Fire Force as the saviors of the souls of the people consumed by flames. However, contrary to the previous Infernal they fought, this one calmly sits on his table, harmlessly enduring his pain. Captain Obi discovers a family picture in the room, and they all understand the Infernal is keeping calm to prevent harming his daughter. As such, Shinra and the Company sorrowfully pray for the Infernal, as Arthur ends his misery in an instant with his plasma sword. Obi, sensing Shinra's guilt, explains that these situations are the daily life of a Fire Force member. Outside, the Captain consoles Mikako, the infernalized man's daughter, causing Arthur and Shinra to learn more about the responsibilities of being in the Special Fire Force.
3	3	"The Rookie Fire Soldier Games"; Transliteration: "Shōbō-kan Shinjin Taikai" (Japanese: 消防官新人大会)	Hideya Itō	Yoriko Tomita & Yamato Haijima	Katsumi Terahigashi	July 27, 2019 (Note: Due to the Kyoto Animation arson attack which occurred on July 18, 2019, episode 3 was postponed by one week.)	August 11, 2019
At the Rookie Fire Soldier games, Shinra recognizes Leonard Burns, the 1st Company Captain, as the firefighter that held his hand on the remains of his home 12 years ago. However, Burns denies recalling the fire, and tells Shinra to join the other rookies, causing him to immediately become suspicious. The games involve entering a booby-trapped building and reaching a crewman posing as an Infernal. Shinra uses his ability to fly to the top, where he encounters a mysterious man who has incapacitated the crewman. While Shinra initially believes it is part of the challenge, the man promises to reveal information about the fire twelve years ago. He fights Shinra, releasing ash from a vial which causes a series of mini-explosions to defeat him, then reveals that Shinra's younger brother Sho is still alive, and asks Shinra to join him. When Arthur and Tamaki, a member of the 1st Company, arrive, the man calls himself Joker, and he makes a last offer for Shinra to join him and learn the truth about the Fire Force. Later, Shinra asks his Captain about the Fire Force, and Obi responds that the Force could not operate without Hajima, a large company that supplies their equipment. He explains that the different Fire Force companies operate independently and do not share the information they find, and Company 8 was formed to investigate companies 1 through 7.
4	4	"The Hero and the Princess"; Transliteration: "Hīrō to Hime" (Japanese: ヒーローと姫)	Shuntarō Tozawa	Yamato Haijima	Shuntarō Tozawa & Mamoru Kurosawa	August 3, 2019	August 18, 2019
At Company 8, an analysis of Joker's exploding ashes reveals that they are Infernal Ashes, made from the remains of dead Infernals. Maki sends Shinra and Arthur to rescue a dog in a tree, and they find that it is one of their mascots, Mamoru, who was "Hoorayed" by local youths. He says that since the fire fighter Setsuo Miyamoto killed four people on a spree, fire fighters have gained the citizens' animosity. Later that day, after Miyamoto is found not guilty at his court case, he bursts into flames and becomes an Infernal, taking his lawyer as a hostage. He goes on a rampage and Company 8 is called into action. Shinra and Arthur rush on ahead and arrive at the courthouse first. They confront Miyamoto and discover that the Infernal is self-aware and scheming, instead of the usual situation of mindlessly running amok. When he escapes, Shinra is sent in pursuit. Meanwhile, Princess Hibana and Company 5 have been observing the events and decide to capture the Infernal for their own purposes, as they desire to study his unusual behaviour. Company 8 arrives, but this results in a tense stand-off over jurisdiction with Company 5. Hibana promises to share the results of their research of the Infernal, and Captain Obi reluctantly allows Hibana to leave with him, although he mistrusts their motives.
5	5	"The Battle Begins"; Transliteration: "Kaisen" (Japanese: 開戦)	Yūji Tokuno	Yoriko Tomita	Yūji Tokuno	August 10, 2019	August 25, 2019
Shinra finds Iris praying in the chapel, and sensing her sorrow, he asks her if she is fine. However, she denies anything is troubling her. During training, Akitaru warns the rookies about the second generation cases who cannot start fires but can control them, which also makes them formidable opponents, especially as he proposes that Company 8 will be using force to get information about Infernals from Princess Hibana and Company 5. Meanwhile, Iris visits Princess Hibana to reduce tensions between the companies, but Hibana plans to use her as bait to attract Company 8. Shinra arrives and issues a challenge to rescue Iris, followed shortly by Hinawa, Maki, and Arthur. They subdue most of Company 5, but then face Toru Kishiri's highly explosive Backdraft Bubblish Gum. Hinawa hits him with multiple ricocheting bullets, while Akitaru and Maki are confronted by the Angels Three, a trio of nearly identical female fighters. Arthur faces Conehead accompanied by the captured Infernal, which has been chemically enhanced. While initially overpowered, Arthur realizes he was fighting with his sword, Excalibur, on his left hand, and upon switching hands, immediately destroys the Infernal, much to Conehead's dismay. Company 8 slowly gains the upper hand while Shinra gains entry and prepares to rescue Iris from Princess Hibana.
6	6	"The Spark of Promise"; Transliteration: "Yakusoku no Hibana" (Japanese: 約束の火華)	Kazuomi Koga	Yamato Haijima	Mamoru Kurosawa	August 17, 2019	September 1, 2019
Hibana reminds Iris of the time when the nuns and children at their orphanage. She was a sister alongside Iris, and used to delight the other nuns with her ability to create fire flowers. After being scolded, she promised Iris to show her the flowers at another time. However, after entering the convent, they witnessed all their fellow nuns get brutally infernalized, causing Hibana to lose her sanity and no longer see beauty in flames. Back in the present, Shinra attacks her, but Hibana uses her heat syncope power to lower his blood pressure, incapacitating him. By strength of will alone Shinra stands, but he is still light-headed and no match for Hibana's abilities, and she creates a flaming sakura whose falling petals burn and engulf him in flames. Shinra still resists, dismaying Hibana, who taunts him by saying he won't ever be a hero. However, Shinra gains the necessary strength to dodge her attacks, and land a powerful kick on her head, knocking her out. Lying on the floor, Hibana's mind drifts back to her time at the orphanage and how she eventually collaborated with Hajima Industries to become a captain and enable her to pursue her experiments. Hibana regains consciousness, and Shinra tells her that he can be her hero, immediately causing her to fall for him. She refuses, but says she will no longer oppose him. She also fulfills her promise to Iris to create flowers from flames and creates an array of colorful irises.
7	7	"The Investigation of the 1st Commences"; Transliteration: "Dai Ichi Chōsa Kaishi" (Japanese: 第1調査開始)	Masaru Kitamura	Yoriko Tomita	Takashi Kawabata	August 24, 2019	September 8, 2019
Captain Leonard Burns of Company 1 gathers his Lieutenant priests Huo Yan Li, Hoshimiya Rekka and Flam Karim in the Special Fire Grand Cathedral 1, suspecting that Captain Akitaru is making his move. Meanwhile, following the so-called joint exercise with Companies 5 and 8, the company members hold a joint BBQ. Hibana nurtures and feeds Shinra, while she has her fellow Company members openly admit their defeat and accept Company 8's supremacy. Later, while talking with Akitaru, Hibana reveals that being defeated by Shinra made her realize her mistakes and regain her sense of heroism, and reassures him that Company 8 can count on the support of Company 5. She then confirms that someone is creating Infernals around the Shinjuku District which comes under the jurisdiction of Company 1, and they agree to cooperate in investigating them. Akitaru uses the rookie training reassignment system to embed Shinra and Arthur with Maki Oze and Takeru Noto from Company 2 in Company 1. When they arrive, Shinra asks for a sparring match to which Burns agrees. Takeru first competes against Rekka, and during the bout, Karim extinguishes stray fireballs with his ability to create ice from sound. Lieutenants Li and Karim withdraw from the contest and Burns takes on Shinra and Arthur himself. Burns easily defeats Arthur and deflects Shinra's strongest attacks, and following their defeat they are placed under the care of Lieutenant Karim. Before leaving, Burns tells Shinra that he still has a long way to go to become a hero.
8	8	"Infernal Insects"; Transliteration: "Homura no Mushi" (Japanese: 焰の蟲)	Shuntarō Tozawa	Yoriko Tomita	Hiroko Kazui	August 31, 2019	September 15, 2019
Akitaru examines Hibana's research, which indicates some kind of insect is what is being used to touch the human core and create Infernals. At Company 1, life seems normal, but Infernals are detected and the company is mobilized. Shinra and Arthur are ordered to stand aside, however, they see someone use an insect to turn a human into an Infernal and they pursue them, only to encounter Karim and Rekka in the shadows. Shinra and Arthur search Karim's room and find an insect in a glass vial, but Karim claims that he left it there on purpose to find the culprit. As such, they pinpoint the evidence on Rekka. Meanwhile, Rekka gets Tamaki to gather some children, promising to protect them from becoming Infernals. Under the pretext of hugging Tamaki, he renders her unconscious and turns the children's caretaker into an Infernal with an insect, before slaying her when she isn't "compatible". Tamaki awakens, and tearfully rejects Rekka's actions, claiming that she used to admire him. However, Rekka explains that he's creating Infernals under the orders of the Evangelist, who seeks to find someone to be the "pilot light". He infects a child who bursts into flames, but the boy manages to extinguish the flames himself and Rekka declares that he is compatible. Tamaki tries to intervene, but Rekka beats her severely. However, she manages to send a fire signal, and before Rekka can kill her, Shinra bursts from above and lands a violent stomp on Rekka's face.
9	9	"The Spreading Malice"; Transliteration: "Moehirogaru Akui" (Japanese: 燃え拡がる悪意)	Yūji Tokuno	Yamato Haijima	Katsumi Terahigashi	September 7, 2019	September 22, 2019
Shinra asks Tamaki if she is OK, prompting her to burst into tears. However, Rekka has survived the blow, and rises to engage with Shinra, while Tamaki shields the children. They use all of their pyrokinesis abilities, but fight to a standstill. Shinra uses his extra mobility to attack Rekka again while Tamaki keeps the children away from harm, getting her clothes incinerated in the process. Shinra almost exhausts the oxygen in his body, but he leaves Rekka heavily injured. Rekka admits that he has been searching for children who have latent pyrokinesis abilities, creating many Infernals in the process and arousing Shinra's suspicions about the abduction of his brother. Rekka says he is working for the Evangelist, whose mission is to engulf the Earth in the "flames of salvation", leading to the creation of a second sun, hence the need for the "pilot light". Rekka begins to create an inferno with his flaming arms but his flames are shut down by Karim, who arrives and seals him in ice. While he is encased, Rekka is shot and killed from afar by two white-cloaked figures, who succeed in silencing him. The assassins then fire at Karim and Huo Yan Li, and Li loses part of his arm protecting Karim. Shinra creates a smokescreen, and with their targets obscured, the cloaked figures retreat. Karim then offers to work with Company 8 to find the mysterious Evangelist. After being suspended by Company 1, Tamaki is transferred to Captain Akitaru's Company 8.
10	10	"The Promise"; Transliteration: "Yakusoku" (Japanese: 約束)	Shūji Miyazaki	Yamato Haijima	Yūji Tokuno	September 14, 2019	October 6, 2019
As Tamaki, Shinra, and Arthur mess around and Hibana delights Maki and Iris with her flames, Hinawa and Akitaru admit that their lives have become livelier with the new arrivals to the Company. The Company captains are called to the Imperial Throne Room for an emergency conference to discuss the Evangelist, and on the way they pass Amaterasu, the perpetual thermal energy plant, which provides all of the Tokyo Empire with energy. Raffles III, the Tokyo Imperial Emperor, explains to Shinra that he is a bearer of the "Adollo Burst", a different and pure type of flame. As such, he is a target of interest for the Evangelist, and advices him to stay protected. However, Shinra explains he can't leave his duties as a fire fighter, as he is entrusted with protecting and saving people. Later, Shinra visits Amaterasu and encounters the Joker, who reveals that Shinra's younger brother, Sho Kusakabe, is working for the Evangelist as the leader of the Knights of the Ashen Flame. Back at Company 8, Akitaru has every fire fighter review reports of incidents, in order to finds leads that may help find the Evangelist. As they have dinner, Shinra tells the other Company 8 members about Sho. Meanwhile, a whole sect of members of the Knights of the Ashen Flame chant for the Evangelist's orders, as Sho sits as their leader.
11	11	"Formation of Special Fire Force Company 8"; Transliteration: "Dai Hachi Tokushu Shōbō-tai Kessei" (Japanese: 第8特殊消防隊結成)	Yūshi Ibe	Yoriko Tomita	Akitoshi Yokoyama	September 21, 2019	October 13, 2019
11	11	"The Mightiest Hikeshi"; Transliteration: "Saikyō no Hikeshi" (Japanese: 最強の火消し)	Yūshi Ibe	Yoriko Tomita	Akitoshi Yokoyama	September 21, 2019	October 13, 2019
When questioned about the formation of Company 8, Hinawa reveals its origin. 3 years prior, Hinawa is a recruit in the Academy, where his only friend is the kind and gentle Tojo, who expresses his desire to baptize his gun. However, Hinawa explains to him that he did not believe fervently in God like the others do. One night, while in their room, Tojo infernalizes before Hinawa's eyes, but even with Tojo pleading him to shoot him, Hinawa is unable to do so. After Tojo's death, Hinawa asks the master weaponsmith for ownership of Tojo's gun. On a scene of a fire sometime later, he meets with Akitaru, who is a member of the regular fire fighters. They are both dismayed when the 3rd Company captain and his men refuse to destroy one of the two Infernals reported, as the other one gives more "points", showing no true regard for the lives of the innocent. As such, they enter the house, and Hinawa respectfully shoots the Infernal with Tojo's gun. As such, they agree to create a Special Fire Force Company. 2 years later, with their new headquarters opened, Akitaru tells Hinawa that they should begin recruiting members, so Hinawa recommends the hard-working Maki, who was a fellow recruit at the Academy. In the Akakusa District, the 7th Company operates in the bustling community. Commander Shinmon Benimaru receives word from his captain Sagamiya Konro that 8 is coming, but he ignores it. Still, Company 8 arrives at the headquarters of Company 7, angering Benimaru. He takes offence and insults Shinra, so Shinra challenges him to a duel, however they are interrupted by a fire alarm. A local man named Kantaro has become an Infernal. Benimaru, regarded as a hero by the local population and the most powerful local fireman (火消し, hikeshi), assaults him with a barrage of flaming matoi, which are effective, but immensely destructive. Shinra is dismayed when he notices the people of the district jubilant even with the destruction of their homes, so an old lady tells him that Benimaru is their hero, and they do not care to die if it is by his hands. Benimaru eventually kills Kantaro by thrusting his hand through his body, impressing Shinra.
12	12	"Eve of Hostilities in Asakusa"; Transliteration: "Asakusa Kaisen Zen'ya" (Japanese: 浅草開戦前夜)	Tatsuma Minamikawa	Yoriko Tomita	Satoshi Nakagawa	October 12, 2019	October 20, 2019
Company 7, under the guidance of Benimaru, lead the reconstruction of the district, with the help of the local population. However, Company 8 lends a hand, helping the relationship between companies improve. Seeing his comrades and Company 8 members getting along, Benimaru, who is normally reluctant to trust others, tells Konro that he does not dislike them. However, that night, Benimaru witnesses two Knights disguised as Akitaru and Hinawa plotting to create more Infernals, and falls for their plan of turning Benimaru against Company 8. Benimaru furiously confronts the real Akitaru and Hinawa, who deny the accusations, and violently attacks them. While Benimaru easily incapacitates Shinra and the other Company 8 members, the powerless Akitaru manages to use his tools to get close and land a hit on Benimaru, stunning him. As Akitaru continues to try to reason with him, Benimaru prepares to unleash his most powerful attack, the Sun Wheel, but Konro risks his life by stopping him despite his decaying body. On his quarters, Benimaru asks for the testimony from the 8th, so Akitaru and Hinawa explain what they were doing at the time Benimaru saw the impostors. As Konro recovers from his injuries, he tells the 8th the story of his condition. He suffers from tephrosis, a condition that will incinerate his body if he uses his powers, after he exceeded the limit of his pyrokinesis when he saved Benimaru from a powerful Infernal in the past.
13	13	"The Trap Is Set"; Transliteration: "Shikumareta Wana" (Japanese: 仕組まれた罠)	Ryōta Aikei	Yoriko Tomita	Mamoru Kurosawa	October 19, 2019	October 27, 2019
Konro concludes his story and tells that after destroying the powerful Infernal, Soichiro Hague Captain of Company 4 offered Konro and Benimaru the opportunity to form their own Company, number 7. Back in the present, Konro and the others emerge to find the Asakusa townspeople people involved in arguments caused by multiple cases of mistaken identity. It is revealed that Yona, a Knight of the Ashen Flame, is using his powers to alter the appearance of Evangelist followers to cause chaos in Asakusa. The White Hoods then create a number of Infernals and use the ensuing confusion to attack Company 8. Shinra and Arthur pursue two of the White Hoods, Haran and Arrow, but have trouble cooperating and fail to coordinate their attacks. Eventually, they gain the upper hand over the White Hoods, and in desperation, Haran swallows an Infernal Bug. Meanwhile, Konro tries to get Benimaru's attention to manage the evacuation of the townspeople, but Benimaru is still preoccupied with disposing of Infernals.
14	14	"For Whom the Flames Burn"; Transliteration: "Dare ga Tame no Honō" (Japanese: 誰が為の炎)	Yūji Tokuno	Yamato Haijima	Katsumi Terahigashi	October 26, 2019	November 3, 2019
While chaos reigns in Asakusa with Infernals appearing and people's appearance being changed at random, Konro and Benimaru argue over who should take charge. Benimaru eventually defers and gains everyone's attention. He explains what's happening, then goes after the Infernals while Konro and Company 7 attend to the fires. Meanwhile, Shinra and Arthur face Haran who has become a horned Infernal after swallowing an Infernal Bug. However, Benimaru intervenes and attacks Haran with his Ignition ability. Benimaru launches Haran into the air with his matoi to spare the town, but Arrow fires a flaming arrow towards them. Shinra uses all of his speed to intercept and deflect the arrow, allowing Benimaru to take the opportunity to use his Crimson Moon (紅月, Akatsuki) ability to create a massive explosion which destroys Haran. Shinra catches Benimaru as he falls from the sky, completely spent from the confrontation. Later, Benimaru and Obi share some sake, sealing the friendship between Companies 7 and 8.
15	15	"The Blacksmith's Dream"; Transliteration: "Kajiya no Yume" (Japanese: 鍛冶屋の夢)	Shuntarō Tozawa	Yoriko Tomita	Mamoru Kurosawa & Shuntarō Tozawa	November 2, 2019	November 10, 2019
Knights of the Ashen Flame, Yona and Arrow, report Shinra's Adolla burst to their commander, Sho Kusakabe, Shinra's brother. Meanwhile, forensic scientist, Viktor Licht, is assigned to Company 8 and Shinra is selected to take Arthur and Iris to recruit the crackerjack engineer, Vulcan. He has an intense dislike for Haijima and the Fire Force, but at his junkyard workshop, they meet Vulcan's apprentice, Yu, who agrees to take them inside. Vulcan explains his dream of recreating animal life on the planet. While there, Captain Dr. Giovanni from Company 3 arrives to ask Vulcan to join him, but he refuses even though Giovanni has stopped supplies getting through to Vulcan's workshop. Vulcan's assistants, Lisa and Yu, explain that Giovanni was one of Vulcan's grandfather's two apprentices, who joined Haijima after the other two died suspiciously. Meanwhile nearby, Giovanni prepares to kill Vulcan, however, Shinra detects his presence.
16	16	"We Are Family"; Transliteration: "Ore-tachi wa Kazoku" (Japanese: 俺たちは家族)	Takahiro Kamei	Mamoru Kurosawa	Mamoru Kurosawa	November 9, 2019	November 17, 2019
Giovanni sends the two Knights of the Ashen Flame, Flail and Mirage, to kill everyone at Vulcan's workshop. He then finds and attacks Shinra who is on lookout in the forest. Giovanni immobilizes Shinra with a massive electric shock and arranges to have him evacuated. Outside the workshop, Arthur takes on his knightly persona and destroys the multitude of Knights of the Ashen Flame but they are illusions created by Mirage. However, when faced with an illusion of himself, Arthur becomes transfixed and is beaten by Flail. Vulcan tells Sister to leave with Lisa and Yu, however, Lisa suddenly reveals that she has been working for the Evangelist to find the key to Amaterasu which was created by Vulcan's family. Meanwhile, Giovanni bypasses Arthur and enters the workshop where he demands the key from Vulcan and critically wounds Yu to force him to talk. However, Vulcan denies any knowledge of the key and Giovanni loses his temper, repeatedly bashing Vulcan's equipment.
17	17	"Black and White and Gray"; Transliteration: "Kuro to Shiro to Haiiro" (Japanese: 黒と白と灰色)	Aya Kobayashi	Yamato Haijima	Hiroko Kazui	November 16, 2019	November 24, 2019
Hibana rescues Shinra who immediately sheds his bindings and flies back to the workshop. He crashes into Giovanni who has accidentally found the key to Amaterasu after smashing Vulcan's projector. Lisa uses her magnetic pyrokinesis to subdue Shinra, but Vulcan tells Iris to press random buttons that eject magnetized metal toy animals which nullify Lisa's powers. Shinra knocks Giovanni outside the workshop, but Shinra then meets Sho and is overjoyed to be reunited with him. However, Sho uses his incredible speed and sword to subdue Shinra and seriously injures Arthur. Fortunately, Viktor Licht arrives with a truck and picks up Shinra, Arthur, Iris, Vulcan, Yu and Hibana although Hibana accuses Viktor of leading the Knights to the workshop. Just as Sho catches up with the group, Joker intervenes. He and Sho are evenly matched for speed and power, but Joker enables Shinra and the others to escape. He then withdraws, leaving Sho with his sword damaged. Yu and Arthur are treated for their injuries while Shinra reports the events to Obi. He then convinces Vulcan to take refuge with Company 8 and Vulcan is surprised to find that the Fire Force members are quite normal and not how he imagined them. The next day, Vulcan returns to the workshop to visit his father and grandfather's graves and explains to them that he will have to break his promise and join the Fire Force to help rebuild the world.
18	18	"The Secrets of Pyrokinesis"; Transliteration: "Hakka no Gokui" (Japanese: 発火の極意)	Yūji Tokuno	Yoriko Tomita	Katsumi Terahigashi	November 23, 2019	December 8, 2019
Karim and Konro visit Company 8's firehouse to share information with Obi and Hibana about the Knights of the Ashen Flame whom they call White-Clad. Meanwhile, Viktor Licht encounters Joker while gathering evidence from around Vulcan's workshop following the fight against Sho, and they discuss Shinra's fire powers. Licht discloses to Company 8 the clues he found to White-Clad's possible location but Hibana is still wary of his true intentions. Meanwhile, Shinmon Benimaru begins training Shinra and Arthur, and puts them through rigorous training to improve their raw combat skills. Following advice from Licht and Benimaru, Shinra begins to efficiently control his flying abilities and develops hand signs, which can focus his blasts into a fast, concentrated burst.
19	19	"Into the Nether"; Transliteration: "Chika e no" (Japanese: 地下への)	Daisuke Chiba	Yoriko Tomita	Tomohiro Furukawa	November 30, 2019	December 15, 2019
Licht explains to Company 8 that he believes that the White-Clad are hiding in the Nether, a forbidden area of abandoned subway tunnels beneath the Tokyo Empire. The next day, the company enters the Nether, the place which is seen as a place of dread. As they walk into the darkness, they are enveloped in a mysterious fog and encounter impostors created by Yona and Mirage and become separated. Sho sends in Assault the Slaughterer, to eliminate Company 8, meanwhile, Maki encounters Flail and a group of White-Clad alone. She defeats the White-Clad and faces Flail whom she attacks and defeats with her two fireballs, Splutter and Flare, which are encased in devices created by Vulcan which concentrates their power. Elsewhere in the tunnels, Assault finds Iris and Tamaki and attacks them with his flaming missiles. Tamaki withstands his attacks, and gets close enough to disable him when her uniform falls open. Before he can react, Iris pummels him to the ground with a metal pipe and they go in search of the others.
20	20	"Wearing His Pride"; Transliteration: "Hokori o Matotte" (Japanese: 誇りを纏って)	Shuntarō Tozawa	Mamoru Kurosawa	Mamoru Kurosawa	December 7, 2019	January 5, 2020
Lieutenant Hinawa searches the tunnels for Shinra. He encounters Arrow and they immediately fire at each other. Shinra finds Licht, but a White-Clad holds a knife at his throat. Shinra uses his tiger hand sign to fire a focused blast to disable the White-Clad, calling the new technique "Shinrabansho". Meanwhile, Hinawa and Arrow use their long-range weapons to attack each other. Hinawa is badly hit, but he fires one last shell which finally defeats Arrow. bystanders, Yona and Mirage, approach the wounded Hinawa to kill him, but Arthur drops down from above. Mirage creates a multitude of illusions of himself to confuse Arthur, however, he uses his new training to detect the real Mirage, ignoring attack from the duplicates. He kills Mirage who is hiding in the darkness and Yona flees for his life. Elsewhere in the tunnels, Maki finds Iris and Tamaki, while Giovanni and Lisa find Vulcan and Obi. Lisa reveals that she is a Knights of the Ashen Flame and her real name is Feeler. Giovanni praises the power and knowledge of his great leader, the Evangelist, and he orders Lisa to defend him and destroy Vulcan and Obi.
21	21	"Those Connected"; Transliteration: "Tsunagaru Mono" (Japanese: 繋がる者)	Aya Kobayashi	Yoriko Tomita	Yuki Yase	December 14, 2019	January 12, 2020
Obi breaks Vulcan and himself free from the grip of Lisa's flaming tentacles. While talking to her, he inserts extinguishing grenades in the tips of the tentacles. They explode, extinguishing her flames and Vulcan catches her as she falls. However, Giovanni grabs Lisa and threatens to kill her if Vulcan does not shoot Obi. Vulcan shoots Obi, so Giovanni releases Lisa. However, Obi is uninjured due to his protective armor. He attacks Giovanni but he is able to fend off Obi's strikes. Meanwhile, Shinra has a series of visions of the past and detects the presence of Sho through his Adolla Burst ability. They meet, but Sho is in no mood for reconciliation, and they engage in a fiery battle. Sho appears to stop time which Licht believes is linked to the Adolla Burst. Sho then hits Shinra with a punishing blow.
22	22	"A Brother's Determination"; Transliteration: "Ani no Iji" (Japanese: 兄の意地)	Shinji Osada	Yamato Haijima	Katsumi Terahigashi	December 21, 2019	January 19, 2020
Knights of the Ashen Flame, Yona and Haumea, meet up and watch the confrontation between Sho and Shinra. Shinra finds himself in a colorless land with black flames rising from the ground and an Infernal with horns over its eyes reaching for him, Sho explaining that this place once called "Hell" is the source of the Adolla Burst. Shinra then sees the Evangelist appear behind his brother. Sho and Shinra return to the real world and Licht explains that Sho can affect the thermal expansion of the universe, appearing to alter the passage of time. Sho mounts a number of lightning-fast attacks against Shinra who appears helpless against them, but Shinra nevertheless keeps trying to reach Sho. Eventually, Shinra moves fast enough by utilizing the Adolla Burst to break into Sho's "motionless world" and strike him. However, it takes a heavy physical toll and Shinra begins to dangerously overheat. Licht warns Shinra that at the speed of light, Shinra's body breaks apart and reassembles itself risking atomizing himself and dying, but Shinra insists that he will reconnect with his little brother and ignores the warning.
23	23	"Smile"; Transliteration: "Egao" (Japanese: 笑顔)	Shuntarō Tozawa & Shō Sugawara	Yoriko Tomita	Mamoru Kurosawa	December 28, 2019 (Note: Episodes 23 and 24 aired back-to-back as a one-hour special.)	January 26, 2020
Shinra again uses his Adolla Burst jump to light speed, causing his childhood memories to be shared with Sho. While initially rejecting memories from their youth, scenes with Shinra caring for him and their mother's love overwhelm Sho, causing him to break down in tears. As Shinra embraces his younger brother, he realizes his uncontrolled speed has resulted in Sho's sword piercing his body. Haumea appears and reveals that they are collecting Adolla Bursts for the Evangelist who wants to kick-start the Great Cataclysm again. Haumea attempts to apprehend Shinra, but Arthur and the rest of Company 8 arrive to rescue him. The Evangelist causes the tunnel to collapse, enabling Haumea and Yona escape with Sho, while Company 8 exits with the severely injured Shinra. At Special Fire Hospital 6, Director Kayoko Huang uses her serpent-like flaming Rod of Ascepius to heal Shinra. He awakens three days later and is greeted by Company 1 commander Captain Leonard Burns who reveals that he knew everything about the Kusakabe house fire and how Sho had been indoctrinated by the Evangelist. Furious, Shinra demands an explanation but Burns challenges him to see if Shinra's resolve is strong enough.
24	24	"The Burning Past"; Transliteration: "Moyuru Kako" (Japanese: 燃ゆる過去)	Yuki Yase	Yamato Haijima	Mamoru Kurosawa & Yuki Yase	December 28, 2019	February 2, 2020
Shinra commences his duel with Commander Burns, whose explosive pyrokinetic ability initially overwhelms Shinra although the youth proves his resolve. Burns then tells Shinra that the Evangelist was active 12 years earlier and knew that the Kusakabe brothers possessed Adolla Burst abilities. When the Evangelist sent the White Clad Haumea to capture Sho, the child's power caused the house to burst into flames. To protect her son, Shinra's mother became the horned Infernal which Shinra believed was the cause of the fire. Burns arrived at the scene and his team saved Shinra, but the boy's demonized mother took Sho and delivered him to the Evangelist. Burns realized the Adolla Link had been awakened in Shinra, but to conceal him from the White Clad, he told Shinra that his family was dead. Burns concludes the story by revealing that he lost his right eye upon looking upon the Evangelist, but gained the use of the Adolla Link. He tells Shinra that his demonized mother may still be alive within the Adolla Link, so Shinra arranges to meet Captain Soichiro Hague of Company 4, hoping to utilize his connection to the Link to make his Infernalized mother human again. A few weeks later, Shinra is discharged from Company 6 and is welcomed home with a party organized by Company 8, including Hibana, Benimaru, Konro, and Karim.

== Home media release ==
=== Japanese ===
DMM.com (Japan – Region 2/A)
Vol.	Episodes	Artwork	Release date	Ref.
1	1–2	Shinra Kusakabe and Arthur Boyle	September 27, 2019	
2	3–6	Akitaru Ōbi and Takehisa Hinawa	October 25, 2019	
3	7–10	Hibana and Iris	November 29, 2019	
4	11–14	Benimaru Shinmon and Konro Sagamiya	December 27, 2019	
5	15–17	Tamaki Kotatsu and Maki Oze	January 31, 2020	
6	18–20	Vulcan Joseph and Viktor Licht	February 28, 2020	
7	21–24	Shinra Kusakabe and Shō Kusakabe	March 27, 2020	

=== English ===
Crunchyroll, LLC (North America – Region 1/A)
Part	Episodes	Release date	Ref.
1	1–12	March 31, 2020	
2	13–24	September 29, 2020	
Complete	1–24	November 2, 2021	
