= The War Is On =

2013 Single by Coldrain

Single by Coldrain

from the album The Revelation
- Released: 25 July 2013 (Japan); 13 May 2014 (International)
- Recorded: December 2012 – February 2013
- Studio: House of Loud (Elmwood Park, New Jersey, US)
- Genre: Post-hardcore; metalcore; alternative metal; hard rock; alternative rock
- Length: 3:33
- Label: VAP; Hopeless; Sony
- Songwriters: Masato Hayakawa; Ryo Yokochi
- Producer: David Bendeth

Coldrain singles chronology
"The Revelation" (2013)	"The War Is On" (2013)	"Behind the Curtain" (2014)

Music video
- "The War Is On" on YouTube

"The War Is On" is a song by Japanese rock band Coldrain. It is the second single for their third studio album The Revelation, produced by David Bendeth, written by Masato Hayakawa and Ryo Yokochi, and was released on 25 July 2013.

At the time of the song's release, this was frontman, Masato Hayakawa's favourite song from the record and the band, in which he states that he didn't think the song wouldn't have translated into a live setting as well as it did.

== Background ==
"The War Is On" was released on 25 July 2013 as the band's second single and the opening track off their third studio album The Revelation, following the release of the first and lead single "The Revelation" which was released three months prior in April of the same year. It was the first single to be released after the album's Japanese release.

=== Promotion and release ===
Upon signing an international deal for the first time with Hopeless Records, becoming the first Japanese band to sign with the North American independent label in the process. The band would go on to announce the re-release of their 2013 album The Revelation. Alongside the announcement, they would re-release the single for "The War Is On" on 13 May 2014. The single would end up getting substantial airplay on BBC Radio 1 and Kerrang! in the UK.

== Composition ==
"The War Is On" has been described as a post-hardcore, metalcore, alternative metal, alternative rock and a hard rock song. The track runs at 160 BPM and is in the key of D minor. It runs for three minutes and 33 seconds. The song was written by Masato Hayakawa and Ryo Yokochi, it was produced by David Bendeth who also handled the production for the rest of the album.

== Track listing ==
iTunes single
No.	Title	Writer(s)	Length
1.	"The War Is On"	Hayakawa; Yokochi	3:33

== Music video ==
The music video for "The War Is On" was released alongside the single on 25 July 2013 on the Gilsoundworks YouTube channel. Among the re-release, the music video would also be published to the Hopeless Records YouTube channel on 13 May 2014; the video was directed by Inni Vision.

The video starts with frontman, Masato Hayakawa, who takes off a creepy looking mask to start the song with the band. The video is set in a large office building in Tokyo where all the workers wear a creepy mask, which are akin to that of which is worn by Michael Myers in the Halloween films. As the song progresses, the band members are individually surrounded by a whole room worth of workers wearing these masks around a circular table which surrounds the band members one by one, as if they are about to be interrogated. As the song culminates, the band defies the group of cult-like workers by jamming the rest of the song in the room as it turns to darkness.

== Personnel ==
Credits adapted from Tidal.

Coldrain

- Masato Hayakawa – lead vocals, lyricist, programming
- Ryo Yokochi – lead guitar, programming, composition
- Kazuya Sugiyama – rhythm guitar, programming
- Ryo Shimizu – bass guitar
- Katsuma Minatani – drums, percussion

Additional personnel

- David Bendeth – producer, mixing, arrangement
- Ted Jensen – mastering
- Brian Robbins – audio engineer, mixing engineer, editing
- Michael Milan – electronic programming, engineer, editing
- John Bender – engineer, vocals, vocal arrangements
- Dan Graziano – editing
- Mike Lisa – editing

== Release history ==
Release history and formats for "The War Is On"
Region	Date	Format	Label
Japan	25 July 2013	Digital download; streaming	VAP
International	13 May 2014	Digital download; streaming	Hopeless; Sony
