= Gone (Coldrain song) =

2015 single by Coldrain

Single by Coldrain

from the album Vena
- Released: 16 September 2015
- Recorded: June 2015
- Studio: Trojan House and Madden Brothers Studio (Los Angeles, California, US)
- Genre: Post-hardcore; hard rock; alternative rock; pop
- Length: 4:12
- Label: VAP; Hopeless
- Songwriters: Masato Hayakawa; Brandon Paddock; Ryo Yokochi
- Producer: Brandon Paddock

Coldrain singles chronology
"Words of the Youth" (2015)	"Gone" (2015)	"Wrong" (2016)

Music video
- "Gone" on YouTube

"Gone" is a song by Japanese rock band Coldrain. It is the lead single for their fourth studio album Vena, produced by Brandon Paddock, written by Masato Hayakawa, Ryo Yokochi and Brandon Paddock, and was released on 16 September 2015. It was the first song written for the album, and received critical success among critics. The song is often regarded as the best that Coldrain has to offer, and is a popular staple song at live shows among international fans.

An acoustic version was released on the follow-up 2016 maxi-single release Vena II.

"Gone" would end up becoming the second song by the band to tally up more than 10 million streams on Spotify, a feat which was only previously achieved by "Mayday".

== Composition ==
"Gone" has been described by critics as being a post-hardcore, hard rock, alternative rock, and pop song. The track runs at 180 BPM and is in the key of E minor. It runs for four minutes and 12 seconds. The song was written by Masato Hayakawa, Brandon Paddock, and Ryo Yokochi, Paddock also handled the production of the single as well as the entirety of the album.

=== Lyrics ===
When asked about the latest single, Masato had a lot to say about the meaning and where some of the foundations came from. He revealed that the claps were implemented to help with the atmosphere and help make the song that much more memorable and is great when fans clap along with the intro at the start of every performance. He also mentioned about how personal this song was to him, as he initially didn't want to share it with the studio. However, Brandon Paddock had other ideas and thought it would be a great lead single for the record. Later on, it was admitted that he was happy that they made the correct decision to use it to promote the record.

Regarding the meaning of the song, this is what the lead-vocalist, Masato David Hayakawa, had to say:

"'Gone' is about giving someone you love everything you have and holding onto them until it just falls apart. The feeling you get when you feel so distant from someone despite them saying they’re there for you and they care about you. I have a feeling a lot of people have had this kind of experience. The anger, frustration and mixed emotions are what we put into this song and video."

== Track listing ==
iTunes single
No.	Title	Writer(s)	Length
1.	"Gone"	Hayakawa; Paddock; Yokochi	4:12

== Promotion and release ==
Days leading up the release, there were teasers posted on social media to hype the debut of their latest single. A tweet which got everyone buzzing on Twitter was when Hayakawa put a post stating the world premiere for the music video was tomorrow, followed by a short clip of the intro of the song. Upon release, the song received substantial airplay on SiriusXM, Octane, BBC Radio 1 and Kerrang! leading to a lot of hype for their upcoming album. As a result, the song received a lot of critical acclaim.

== Music video ==
The music video for "Gone" was released alongside the single on September 16, 2015, and was directed by Maxilla.

The video revolves around a couple who are shown to be happy, sad and have rough patches. They eventually call it quits and then realise what they had, that spark, is now gone. Mirrors shattering are also a centre point, and helps convey the idea of reflecting on what they had which is now fading away into dust. In the end, it is revealed that she left him behind after the realisation hits that she is gone for good. Intertwined with the music, silhouettes of the band members are shown playing the song with bright studio lights of the albums logo flashing around them.

== Personnel ==
Credits adapted from Tidal.

Coldrain

- Masato Hayakawa – lead vocals, lyricist
- Ryo Yokochi – lead guitar, programming, keyboards, composer
- Kazuya Sugiyama – rhythm guitar, backing vocals
- Ryo Shimizu – bass guitar, backing vocals
- Katsuma Minatani – drums, percussion

Additional Personnel

- Brandon Paddock – producer, mixing, arrangements
- Ted Jensen – mastering
- Andrew D'Angelo – assistant engineer
- Courtney Ballard – studio manager, second assistant engineer
- Devon Corey – editing, additional tracking
- Emilo Rivera – studio assistant
