= Chasing Shadows (Coldrain song) =

2025 song by Coldrain

Single by Coldrain

from the EP Optimize
- Language: English; Japanese
- Released: 6 August 2025
- Recorded: 2024–25
- Genre: Alternative metal; hard rock; pop rock
- Length: 3:47
- Label: Sony Music; Century Media
- Songwriters: Masato Hayakawa; Ryo Yokochi
- Producer: Ryo Yokochi

Coldrain singles chronology
"Incomplete" (2025)	"Chasing Shadows" (2025)	"Free Fall" (2025)

Music video
- "Chasing Shadows" on YouTube

"Chasing Shadows" is a song by Japanese rock band Coldrain. Written by frontman Masato Hayakawa and lead guitarist Ryo Yokochi, it was released on 6 August 2025 as the second single from the band's fifth EP Optimize, via Sony Music Japan and Century Media Records.

“Chasing Shadows” is particularly notable for breaking from the band’s traditionally dominated English-language catalogue, marking this as the first ever instance of Japanese lyrics being performed in one of the band's songs.

The band have recorded and released various live videos of "Chasing Shadows" that were performed at Summer Breeze Open Air, Blare Fest 2026 and Haziketemazare.

== Background ==
In March 2025, the band left long time label Warner Music Japan and signed to Sony Music Japan. Simultaneously, they inked an international deal with German based label Century Media Records and released the song "Incomplete", which was later revealed to be the lead single for their upcoming fifth EP Optimize. On 6 August, the band surprise released "Chasing Shadows" alongside an accompanying music video, acting as the second single from Optimize. It was released ahead of the band's August tour dates in Germany, where the band debuted the song live for the first time on 8 August at Open Flair Festival in Eschwege. It was promoted in the UK on BBC Radio One, being played on Daniel P. Carter's Rock Show, while also being played extensively on rock radio around Europe.

== Composition ==
"Chasing Shadows" has been described by critics as alternative metal, hard rock, and pop rock, with electronic elements. It has been sonically compared to American rock band Linkin Park, with Hayakawa admitting that they partially inspired the song's sound. The song was written by the band's vocalist Masato Hayakawa and lead guitarist Ryo Yokochi, while the latter handled the song's production. The song was written about questioning authority figures and the values provided, while seeking for the truth. Some critics have described the song as having "strong political undertones" within the current political climate. When asked about the song, Hayakawa explained:

"This song was inspired by tales of people who questioned the values and rules they were given, and try to find the truth for themselves. I wanted to share how important it is to explore and understand each other, instead of easily moving toward conflict or anger. Even if the world feels closed off, the fire inside us can’t be put out. It’s a message to keep taking small steps forward, even when we feel lost."

Despite being a Japanese band, they never sang in the language due to that their frontman Masato Hayakawa, being half American, was more influenced by Western music and that singing in Japanese never felt natural to him, citing that he always felt uncomfortable and sounded like a foreigner when singing in the language. Early on, Hayakawa made the decision to only sing and write in English on all of the band's songs because they came more naturally to him when writing in English. When asked back in 2016, Hayakawa spoke about the possibility of singing in Japanese on one of the band's songs: "When it comes out natural, I think it will happen, but not yet." Eventually this became a reality on "Chasing Shadows", featuring the first ever Japanese lyrics on one of the band's songs, being briefly belted out during the second refrain in the song's third minute. In an interview with Rolling Stone, Hayakawa explained that he sung in Japanese on the song because he wanted to personally challenge himself to keep up with the song's themes.

== Track listing ==
Digital single
No.	Title	Writer(s)	Length
1.	"Chasing Shadows"	Masato Hayakawa; Ryo Yokochi	3:47
2.	"Incomplete"	Hayakawa; Yokochi	3:35
Total length:			7:22

== Music video ==
The official music video for "Chasing Shadows" was released on 6 August 2025. It was directed by Masaki Watanabe.

The video features the band performing the song at night on a desolate plain, with an eclyptic backdrop overshadowed by dark silhouettes surrounding the band. Completely set in black and white, the video has been described as "atmospheric" and uses many light effects accompanied by the band's performance. Fans online have compared Masato's Hayakawa's attire in the video to that of Neo from The Matrix (1999) and D.B. Cooper, potentially alluding to the song's themes of constructed realities. Behind the scenes footage revealed that the video was filmed on a beach over the course of the day, with the scenes of the flashing light effects filmed at night.

== Personnel ==
Credits adapted from Tidal.

Coldrain

- Masato Hayakawa – lead vocals, lyrics, composition
- Ryo Yokochi – lead guitar, programming, composition, production
- Kazuya Sugiyama – rhythm guitar
- Ryo Shimizu – bass guitar
- Katsuma Minatani – drums

Additional personnel

- Sam Guaiana – mixing
- Mike Kalajian – mastering (Rogue Planet Mastering, Gardiner, New York, US)
- Steven McNair – engineering
- Ryo Trackmaker – engineering

== Charts ==
Chart performance for "Chasing Shadows"
Chart (2025)	Peak position
Japan Digital Rock (Billboard)	42
