= Renai Neet: Wasureta Koi no Hajimekata =

- Genre: Romantic comedy
- Written by: Yūko Nagata
- Directed by: Mahoko Takanari; Yuuki Ōsawa; Akio Yoshida; Takayoshi Tanazawa
- Starring: Yukie Nakama; Kuranosuke Sasaki; Mikako Ichikawa; Kento Nagayama
- Country of origin: Japan
- Original language: Japanese
- No. of episodes: 10

Production
- Producers: Mahoko Takanari; Sanae Suzuki; Akira Shimura; Yuri Sekikawa
- Production location: Japan

Original release
- Network: TBS
- Release: 20 January – 23 March 2012

Renai Neet: Wasureta Koi no Hajimekata (恋愛ニート～忘れた恋のはじめ方) is a Japanese television drama series premiered on TBS on 20 January 2012. Yukie Nakama played the lead role.

== Cast ==
- Yukie Nakama as Rin Kinoshita
- Kuranosuke Sasaki as Naoya Matsumoto
- Mikako Ichikawa as Miho Watanabe
- Kento Nagayama as Shunpei Makino
- Yuji Tanaka as Kouta Tada
- Ryō as Nanako Aizawa
- Shigeru Muroi as Hiromi Amamiya
- Jun Hashimoto as Junichirō Kamiyama
- Jutta Yuuki as Akira Takahashi
- Takuma Sasaki as Dai Nakamura
- Shuhei Minami as Tōru Koizumi
- Oonishi as Hajime Tanabe
- Tsubasa Honda as Yui Kinoshita
- Jun Nishiyama as Itsuki Kinoshita
- Eiji Moriyama as Takashi Kobayakawa
- Tasuku Nagase as Takuya Yamada
- Anna Nose as Saori Kawashima
