= Annalynn =

Thai metalcore band

ANNALYNN
- Origin: Bangkok, Thailand
- Genres: Metalcore • melodic hardcore • deathcore
- Years active: 2004–present
- Labels: Screamlab • Banana • Cube • Greyscale
- Members: Nuttapop Cheunsuktananun; Supatchaya Sompong; Eakaratch Kaewsomdej; Nattabhol Larp-ar-parat
- Past members: Thitipong Petcharat; Nathaphon Jutathaveewan

Annalynn (or stylized in all-caps ANNALYNN) is a Thai metalcore band formed in Bangkok in 2004.

== Biography ==
Annalynn was formed in 2004 after several local metal bands broke up. The band consists of vocalist Nathapon Jutathaveewan, guitarists Supatchaya Sompong and Nuttapop Cheunsuktananun, bassist Eakaratch Kaewsomdej and drummer Nattbhol Larp-ar-parat. Past member is guitarist Thitipong Petcharat.

In the year of formation the band published their first EP entitled First Shut Up, Then Shut Down. Three years later the musicians produced and published the debut album Science of Scream which was released via Vietnamese underground record label Screamlab Records. Their second EP, The Misery Years, was released in 2010 via Screamlab.

In February 2015, the band released their second full-length album Stare Down the Undefeated via Thai record label Banana Records. In 2017, the album was re-issued in Japan via Radtone Music. The album features the tracks Dead Weight and Never Coming Down with feature vocals by Jonathan Vigil of The Ghost Inside and Ryo Kinoshita of Crystal Lake. In October 2019, the band released their song Holy Gravity with guest vocals by CJ McMahon of Thy Art Is Murder.

The group has since signed a contract with Thai branch of Warner Music. In February 2021, Annalynn released the single Closer to the Edge of their third album A Conversation with Evil which was released in Japan in April the same year via Japanese label Cube Records. It features guest vocals by McMahon and Masato Hayakawa of Coldrain.

ANNALYNN play concerts on international level, having played in China, Malaysia, Singapore, Hongkong, Taiwan and Japan sharing stage with acts like Knocked Loose, Thy Art Is Murder, Crystal Lake, Loathe, Your Demise and Brutality Will Prevail.

On March 24, 2023, the group played their first concert in Quezon City as guest at the Philippine final of Wacken Metal Battle together with Within Destruction, Born of Osiris and Suicide Silence. Four days later, Australian label Greyscale Records announced having signed ANNALYNN.

== Controversy ==
The band suspended all activities after singer Nathaphon “Bon” Jutathaveewan admitted to faking a cancer diagnosis to pay off debts. In July 2024, it was announced that Jutathaveewan had been diagnosed with stomach cancer, leading to financial donations, increased show bookings, and fundraising merchandise. Both the band and its record label implored fans to provide donations to help with medical expenses due to the singer “being from a third world country.” This was done through a GoFundMe page.

In November 2024, Jutathaveewan came forward, admitting in a statement that he feigned the illness for money to pay off personal debts and loans, adding that nobody else, including his bandmates and label, was involved in the deception. The members of Annalynn also released a collective statement explaining their side of the story.

Jutathaveewan's statement read [via Lambgoat]:

"I would like to offer my sincerest apologies to everyone for everything that has transpired, especially for both the deception around my health issues and the false claims that were made. I deeply regret my actions and fully accept responsibility for the mistakes I have made. I am truly sorry for the harm and distress this has caused.

The problems I have faced stemmed from personal financial struggles, including debts from illegal loans and poor business decisions that I failed to manage over the years. The situation escalated to the point where I couldn’t see a way out, and I was placed under immense pressure, both financially and personally, which led to the mistakes I made.

Unfortunately, I have betrayed the trust and kindness that so many of you have shown me. My poor decisions have impacted not only my own life but also the lives of others around me, and I deeply regret that.

I WANT TO CLARIFY THAT NO ONE ELSE—BE IT THE MUSIC LABEL, FRIENDS, MY FAMILY, OR MY BANDMATES—WAS INVOLVED IN THESE ISSUES.

I am now facing the consequences of my choices and have learned invaluable lessons from this experience. I am committed to doing everything in my power to make things right and resolve the situation as quickly as possible. I understand that my words cannot undo the damage that has been done, but I want to humbly ask for your forgiveness. I am truly sorry for the pain and inconvenience my actions have caused, and I am deeply remorseful for the trust I have broken."

The future of the band now remains in question.

== Music ==
Vocalist Nathapon Jututhaveewan named acts like Beastie Boys, Deftones, As I Lay Dying, Terror and Misery Signals as the band's musical influence.

Loudersound described ANNALYNN as modern nu metal band with screamed vocals and low-tuned guitars. According to Loudersound, the sound is similar to acts like Emmure and For the Fallen Dreams. The musicians uses musical elements like breakdowns and two-step. The music is described as melodic hardcore which is influenced by elements of a way more heavier metalcore sound.

== Discography ==
- 2004: Shut Up, Then Shut Down (EP, Self-published)
- 2007: Science of Scream (Album, Screamlab Records)
- 2010: A Year of Misery (EP, Screamlab Records)
- 2015: Stare Down the Undefeated (Album, Banana Records, re-issued in 2017 in Japan via Radtone Music)
- 2017: Deceiver/Believer (EP)
- 2021: A Conversation with Evil (Album, Cube Records)

== Members ==
Active members

- Nuttapop Cheunsuktananun – guitarist
- Supatchaya Sompong – guitarist
- Eakaratch Kaewsomdej – bassist
- Nattabhol Larp-ar-parat – drummer

Past members

- Thitipong Petcharat – guitarist
- Nathaphon Jutathaveewan – vocalist
