= Vena II =

Single by Coldrain
- Released: 17 August 2016
- Genre: Post-hardcore; hard rock; alternative rock; acoustic rock
- Length: 16:06
- Label: VAP
- Producer(s): Brandon Paddock

Coldrain singles chronology
"Vena" (2015)	"Vena II" (2016)	"Fateless" (2017)

Vena II (alternatively known as Vena: Chapter 2) is the third maxi-single by Japanese rock band Coldrain, released on 17 August 2016.

Originally intended to have the two new songs, along with the acoustic renditions of "Gone" and "The Story" to be included on a deluxe edition of Vena. Vena II would later be released as a maxi-single, with physical copies being exclusively released in Japan after complications and difficulties with their international label Hopeless Records.

== Track listing ==
All lyrics written by Masato Hayakawa, all music composed by Masato Hayakawa and Ryo Yokochi.

CD

No.	Title	Length
1.	"Born to Bleed"	3:52
2.	"Undertow"	3:29
3.	"Gone" (Acoustic)	4:34
4.	"The Story" (Acoustic)	4:11
Total length:		16:06

Limited edition DVD (Vena Japan Tour Live in Tokyo)

No.	Title	Length
1.	"Vena"
2.	"Wrong"
3.	"Evolve"
4.	"To Be Alive"
5.	"Divine"
6.	"Time Bomb"
7.	"Words of the Youth"
8.	"No Escape"
9.	"Fire in the Sky"
10.	"Inside of Me"
11.	"Heart of the Young"
12.	"The War Is On"
13.	"Pretty Little Liar"
14.	"Adrenaline"
15.	"Whole"
16.	"Confession"
17.	"Never Look Away"
18.	"24-7"
19.	"Die Tomorrow"
20.	"Gone"
21.	"Aware and Awake"
22.	"Runaway"
23.	"The Revelation"
24.	"The Story"
25.	"Six Feet Under"
26.	"Final Destination"

== Personnel ==
- Masato David Hayakawa (マサト, Masato) – lead vocals, acoustic guitar
- Ryo Yokochi (ヨコチ, Y.K.C.) – lead guitar, programming
- Kazuya Sugiyama (スギ, Sugi) – rhythm guitar, backing vocals
- Ryo Shimizu (リョウ, RxYxO) – bass guitar, backing vocals
- Katsuma Minatani (カツマ, Katsuma) – drums

== Charts ==
Chart performance for Vena II
Chart (2016)	Peak position
Billboard Japan Hot 100	47
Japan Top Singles Sales (Billboard)	22
Japanese Albums (Oricon)	21
