= Revolution (Coldrain song) =

2018 single by Coldrain

Single by Coldrain

from the album The Side Effects
- Released: 12 December 2018
- Studio: Studio Barbarosa (Orlando, Florida, United States)
- Genre: Nu metal; metalcore
- Length: 3:45
- Label: Warner Music Japan
- Songwriters: Masato Hayakawa; Ryo Yokochi
- Producer: Michael Baskette

Coldrain singles chronology
"R.I.P." (2017)	"Revolution" (2018)	"Coexist" (2019)

Music video
- "Revolution" on YouTube "Revolution (Official Live Video)" on YouTube

"Revolution" (stylised in all caps) is a song by Japanese rock band Coldrain. It is the lead single for their sixth studio album The Side Effects, produced by Michael Baskette, written by Masato Hayakawa and Ryo Yokochi, and was released on 12 December 2018.

Stylistically, this approaches a more experimental sound by incorporating some rap elements, of which Coldrain has not used before. This is what would typically be associated with the sub-genre of nu metal.

== Background ==
"Revolution" was released on 12 December 2018 as the band's lead single and the eleventh track off their sixth studio album The Side Effects, the follow-up and second single "Coexist" would be released in July 2019.

On 29 September, a new video game Mobile Suit Gundam: Extreme Vs. 2 was announced. Alongside the announcement, Coldrain would provide the theme song for the game. A new song titled "Revolution". However after the release of the game, they kept quiet. This was until they unexpectedly released the single on 12 December, instantly becoming a fan favourite among Coldrain fans.

== Composition ==
"Revolution" is a nu metal and a metalcore song. The track runs at 148 BPM and is in the key of D minor. It runs for three minutes and 45 seconds. The song was written by Masato Hayakawa and Ryo Yokochi, while Michael Baskette handled the production for the single as well as the entirety of the album.

== Track listing ==
iTunes single
No.	Title	Writer(s)	Length
1.	"Revolution"	Masato Hayakawa; Ryo Yokochi	3:45

== Live performances ==
- The official live version of "Revolution" was performed at Blare Fest 2020 and was the first of two performances that was used to promote the live album for Live & Backstage at Blare Fest. 2020, of which the performance was included on. The performance was released on the band's official YouTube channel on 4 September 2020.

== Music video ==
The music video for "Revolution" was released over a whole month after the single's release, being released on 25 January 2019, and was directed by Koh Yamada.

The music video takes homage to "In the End" by Linkin Park. Visual and stylistic references are shown throughout as the band play the song in a desert, intertwined with a dark setting with a visible decaying tree in the background. In the climax, the sun would drop down on the band, draining life from their surroundings and making the performing band turn into dust as the song ends.

== Personnel ==
Credits adapted from Tidal.

Coldrain

- Masato Hayakawa – lead vocals, lyrics
- Ryo Yokochi – lead guitar, programming, composition
- Kazuya Sugiyama – rhythm guitar
- Ryo Shimizu – bass guitar
- Katsuma Minatani – drums

Additional personnel

- Michael Baskette – producer, mixing, arrangements
- Ted Jensen – mastering
- Jeff Moll – recording engineer
- Joshua Saldate – assistant engineer

== Charts ==
Chart (2019)	Peak position
Japanese Daily Hot 100	64
Japanese Weekly	99
