= January 1st (song) =

2019 Single by Coldrain

Single by Coldrain

from the album The Side Effects
- Released: 8 August 2019
- Recorded: February 2019
- Studio: Studio Barbarosa (Orlando, Florida, United States)
- Genre: Alternative rock
- Length: 4:40
- Label: Warner Music Japan
- Songwriters: Masato Hayakawa; Ryo Yokochi
- Producer: Michael Baskette

Coldrain singles chronology
"Coexist" (2019)	"January 1st" (2019)	"The Side Effects" (2019)

Music video
- "January 1st" on YouTube

"January 1st" (stylised in all caps) is a song by Japanese rock band Coldrain. It is the third single and sixth track on their sixth studio album The Side Effects, produced by Michael Baskette, written by Masato Hayakawa and Ryo Yokochi, and was released on 8 August 2019.

"January 1st" is the first ever "soft" song by the band to be released as a single.

== Background ==
"January 1st" was released on 8 August 2019 as the band's third single and the sixth track off their sixth studio album The Side Effects, following the release of the second single "Coexist" which was released just the month prior. It was the last single to be released prior to the album's release.

On 7 August, several teases were made on Coldrain's social media accounts with a photo of lead singer, Masato Hayakawa, surrounded by darkness, as well as a translucent image of him in the same photo which is contrasted by a flame and water. This tease would be followed up by an announcement made of the official music video, which would be slated for release on the following day.

== Composition ==
"January 1st" is an alternative rock song. The track runs at 150 BPM and is in the key of A major. It runs for four minutes and 40 seconds. The song was written by Masato Hayakawa and Ryo Yokochi, it was produced by Michael Baskette.

=== Meaning and lyrics ===
"January 1st" is written about Hayakawa's dog, who died on January 1, 2019. Struggling to cope with his loss, who felt like family to him. He wrote the song to cope about how he could not let go for someone he loved dearly and had many memories of. As a result of this, the chorus would be a direct reference to how Hayakawa felt about it.

Hayakawa would directly request "January 1st" to be a single and a music video released by the band. This would prove to be ambitious, as it would be the first slow song by the band to ever be released as a single.

== Track listing ==
No.	Title	Lyrics	Music	Length
1.	"January 1st"	Masato Hayakawa	Ryo Yokochi	4:40

== Music video ==
The music video for "January 1st" was released alongside the single on 8 August 2019, and was directed by Koh Yamada.

The video starts out with frontman, Masato Hayakawa, walking up from the ocean on the beach during the night to join his bandmates to perform the song. Flames from campfires surround the band as they perform. These scenes are intertwined with Hayakawa singing the song during the day on an escalator, under a bridge, and in the sea on the same beach while also scaling up stairs in a well which symbolises moving on.

== Personnel ==
Credits adapted from Tidal.

Coldrain

- Masato Hayakawa – lead vocals, lyrics
- Ryo Yokochi – lead guitar, programming, composition
- Kazuya Sugiyama – rhythm guitar
- Ryo Shimizu – bass guitar
- Katsuma Minatani – drums

Additional personnel

- Michael Baskette – producer, mixing, arrangements
- Ted Jensen – mastering
- Jeff Moll – recording engineer
- Joshua Saldate – assistant engineer

== Charts ==
Chart (2019)	Peak position
Japanese Daily Hot 100	57
Japanese Weekly	74
