= Coexist (song) =

2019 Single by Coldrain

Single by Coldrain

from the album The Side Effects
- Released: 4 July 2019
- Recorded: February 2019
- Studio: Studio Barbarosa (Orlando, Florida, United States)
- Genre: Nu metal; alternative metal; alternative rock; hard rock
- Length: 3:42
- Label: Warner Music Japan
- Songwriters: Masato Hayakawa; Ryo Yokochi
- Producer: Michael Baskette

Coldrain singles chronology
| "Revolution" (2018) | "Coexist" (2019) | "January 1st" (2019) |

Music video
- "Coexist" on YouTube

"Coexist" (stylised in all caps) is a song by Japanese rock band Coldrain. It is the second lead single for their sixth studio album The Side Effects, produced by Michael Baskette, written by Masato Hayakawa and Ryo Yokochi, and was released on 4 July 2019.

Coexist would later be critically acclaimed to be one of the "100 Greatest Songs of 2019", featured alongside artists and bands such as James Blunt, Jason Derulo, Bruno Mars, Slipknot, Trivium and Korn, as well as being one of the "100 Greatest Metal" songs of all time.

== Background ==
"Coexist" was released on 4 July 2019 as the band's second single and the second track off their sixth studio album The Side Effects, following the release of the first and lead single "Revolution" which was released in December of the previous year.

The song was first teased in a preview video for the unveiling announcement of The Side Effects on the bands social media accounts on 16 May 2019, where only the first 90 seconds were previewed. The full song was officially released as a single two months later, alongside a music video, which would coincide with the significance of US Independence Day on the 4th of July. On the same day, the band would release the official tracklist for the rest of the album.

== Composition ==
"Coexist" is a nu metal, alternative metal, alternative rock and a hard rock song. The track runs at 138 BPM and is in the key of C♯ minor. It runs for three minutes and 42 seconds. The song was written by Masato Hayakawa and Ryo Yokochi, while Michael Baskette handled the production. The working title for "Coexist" was "Afraid."

In an interview with Gekirock, the atmosphere was noted about the Japanese sounding influences on "Coexist". In response, Hayakawa would explain the thought process behind the song and the ideas behind it.

"It's a song that seems to be very Japanese. The first factor that appeals to Japanese people is the first sound you hear in the song. From the moment we all listened to the demo for the first time, to the feeling of the initial atmosphere, we said to ourselves; "Oh, that's good!" It's a song that caught my heart, so no matter how much I play with beats from there, I want to listen to more, or on the contrary, it comes to me that from the Japanese audience's point of view, I think the quality of the sound and a little gimmick are the key points that will tickle you. I think it's a song that I can't write about if I'm not Japanese, and personally it's a song that I feel is very "Japanese". The song does not feature a koto, but there are moments like that in terms of sound. After going around Europe, I think it was a good time to push for that kind of thing. I think that the fact that people from overseas are receiving a technique that is also proof that people feel more like Japanese people."

=== Lyrics ===
Written by vocalist Masato Hayakawa. From his viewpoint, the lyrics display a genuine cry of concern towards society, because he feels that "hate" and ill-will towards others has become normalised. To counter-act this, we should be loving each other and learning to be able to coexist with one another. This is directly screamed by Hayakawa, where he says:

"LEARN TO LOVE AND COEXIST."

== Track listing ==
iTunes single
| No. | Title | Writer(s) | Length |
|---|---|---|---|
| 1. | "Coexist" | Masato Hayakawa; Ryo Yokochi | 3:42 |

== Music video ==
The music video for "Coexist" was released alongside the single on July 4, 2019, and was directed by Takuya Oyama.

The music video is played within a futuristic-styled background, implied to be set inside of a UFO and revolves around a romantic couple who are portrayed by Japanese actors Tasuku Nagase and Yumiko Takahashi, who both get individually abducted by a blue-looking alien, portrayed by Coldrain frontman Masato Hayakawa. They spend 7 days isolated and studied by the alien, who eventually allows them to reunite and leave the ship after finding an error in the system. The band playing the song is intertwined with this storyline.

== Personnel ==
Credits adapted from Tidal.

Coldrain

- Masato Hayakawa – lead vocals, lyrics
- Ryo Yokochi – lead guitar, programming, composition
- Kazuya Sugiyama – rhythm guitar
- Ryo Shimizu – bass guitar
- Katsuma Minatani – drums

Additional personnel

- Michael Baskette – producer, mixing, arrangements
- Ted Jensen – mastering
- Jeff Moll – recording engineer
- Joshua Saldate – assistant engineer

== Charts ==
| Chart (2019) | Peak position |
|---|---|
| Japanese Daily Hot 100 | 32 |
| Japanese Weekly | 56 |
