= The Side Effects (album) =

Studio album by Coldrain
- Released: August 28, 2019
- Recorded: January 30, 2019 – February 28, 2019
- Studio: Studio Barbarosa (Orlando, Florida, US)
- Genre: Post-hardcore; nu metal; metalcore; alternative metal; alternative rock; hard rock
- Length: 46:24
- Label: Warner Music Japan
- Producer: Michael Baskette

Coldrain chronology
20180206 Live at Budokan (2018)	The Side Effects (2019)	Live & Backstage at Blare Fest. 2020 (2020)

Singles from The Side Effects
- 1. "Revolution" Released: December 12, 2018; 2. "Coexist" Released: July 4, 2019; 3. "January 1st" Released: August 8, 2019; 4. "The Side Effects" Released: August 27, 2019; 5. "Mayday" Released: November 2, 2019; 6. "See You" Released: January 17, 2020; 7. "Speak" Released: March 21, 2020

The Side Effects (stylised in all caps) is the sixth studio album by Japanese rock band Coldrain. Recorded at Studio Barbarosa in Orlando, Florida with producer Michael 'Elvis' Baskette (who previously produced the band's 2017 predecessor Fateless), it was released on August 28, 2019 by Warner Music Japan.

The Side Effects is the second Coldrain album to be released by Warner Music Japan, the first being Fateless. This would be the follow-up to 2017's Fateless and the last album by the band to be released in the 2010s. It would be their lowest charted album on the Oricon Albums Chart since the release of The Enemy Inside, which debuted and peaked at number 21, for which The Side Effects would just barely scrape into the top ten at number 10. The Revelation, Vena and Fateless fairing much better at number 7, 9 and 8 respectively. However, The Side Effects would fare much better on the Billboard Japan Hot Albums chart, as it would debut and peak at number 8, selling over 8,600 copies in its first week.

The album would produce seven singles, four of which were released before the release of The Side Effects. "Revolution" being the only one to be released the year prior to the release of The Side Effects, which first got showcased in September 2018 as the main theme for Mobile Suit Gundam: Extreme Vs 2, but not being released as a single until December 2018. "Coexist", "January 1st" and the title track "The Side Effects" all being released in 2019 and before the release date of The Side Effects. "Coexist" would be unveiled in July 2019, with both "January 1st" and "The Side Effects" being released the following month in August, the title track being released the day before the release of the album. The Side Effects currently has three singles released since the release of the album. "Mayday" on November 2, the last single to be released by the band in the 2010s. The track would feature Ryo Kinoshita from Japanese metalcore band Crystal Lake, of which would also be featured as the second opening theme for the popular anime, Fire Force. "See You" and "Speak" would be released during the new decade. "See You" was released on January 17, while "Speak", the final single from the record, which was released on March 21, 2020.

The Side Effects features a more experimental sound which incorporates vocal elements of rapping and electronica backgrounds, which is heard in songs like "Revolution", "The Side Effects", "Speak" and "Coexist" of which is typically heard in the metal subgenre nu metal.

== Background and promotion ==
Teasers for the album dated all the way back to September 29, 2018, where Coldrain announced a new song to be the theme song for Mobile Suit Gundam: Extreme Vs 2, which was titled "Revolution". The song was later released as a single on December 12. This included a music video to complement its release the following month.

A few days after, Masato Hayakawa announced on his Instagram that he was entering the studio with the rest of the band to record new material which would be released later on in the year. Circulation quickly spread hype and buzz among fans and critics alike, to where the silence was broken with multiple photos and videos being shared on the band members social media accounts of them in the studio. They finished recording at the end of February, and announced a new one man tour a few weeks later, as well as the title for the new album to be named "The Side Effects". Another teaser video used the second lead single "Coexist", which was released on July 4 on digital formats and as a music video, garnering over 370,000 views within the first month on YouTube.

They would go on to tour Europe in June to continue to promote the upcoming record by playing various festivals such as Download, Pinkpop, Rock am Ring and Rock im Park. Three of which, Coldrain previously played in 2014 upon making their worldwide debut with The Revelation. Alongside this, they would play several headline shows in small venues around the UK and France.

With the album release impending, the band released two more music videos, "January 1st" and "The Side Effects", on August 8 and 27, respectively.

== Composition and musical style ==
Before the recording process, demos were sent to the producer Michael Baskette similarly to what the band did in advance for their 2017 predecessor Fateless. This time, the demos were noted to be much more detailed and near-production standard to give Baskette a good idea as to what direction the band wanted to take with The Side Effects as they were a lot more organised, which made the recording process a lot easier to record, and it took just over a month to record overall. Baskette talked about the primary songwriter and the band's lead guitarist, Ryo Yokochi, saying that his songwriting is what really elevated the LP to new levels.

The Side Effects has been sonically described by critics as post-hardcore, metalcore, alternative metal, alternative rock, nu metal, and hard rock.

== Commercial performance and sales ==
The album debuted at No. 10 on the Oricon Albums Chart, where it would stay on the charts for the following 7 weeks. The album also charted on the Billboard Japan Hot Albums chart, where it peaked at No. 8, selling over 8,600 physical copies in its first week nationwide. It would drop to No. 43 the following week by a whopping 35 positions, but still selling over 1,200 copies in that timeframe.

== Track listing ==
All lyrics written by Masato Hayakawa, all music composed by Masato Hayakawa and Ryo Yokochi.

The Side Effects track listing
No.	Title	Length
1.	"Mayday" (featuring Ryo Kinoshita of Crystal Lake)	3:47
2.	"Coexist"	3:41
3.	"See You"	3:49
4.	"Speak"	3:13
5.	"The Side Effects"	3:44
6.	"January 1st"	4:39
7.	"Insomnia"	4:22
8.	"Answer/Sickness"	3:44
9.	"Breathe"	4:13
10.	"Stay the Course"	4:09
11.	"Revolution"	3:45
12.	"Li(e)fe"	3:18
Total length:		46:24

Deluxe edition
No.	Title	Length
1.	"Making The Side Effects"	58:30

== Personnel ==
Credits retrieved from album's liner notes.

Coldrain

- Masato David Hayakawa (マサト, Masato) – lead vocals, lyricist, composer
- Ryo Yokochi (ヨコチ, Y.K.C) – lead guitar, programming, keyboards, composer
- Kazuya Sugiyama (スギ, Sugi) – rhythm guitar, backing vocals
- Ryo Shimizu (リョウ, RxYxO) – bass guitar, backing vocals
- Katsuma Minatani (カツマ, Katsuma) – drums, percussion

Guest feature

- Ryo Kinoshita of Crystal Lake – guest vocals on "Mayday"

Additional personnel

- Michael Baskette – producer, mixing
- Ted Jensen – mastering
- Jef Moll – recording engineer
- Joshua Saldate – assistant engineer

== Charts ==
Chart performance for The Side Effects
Chart (2019)	Peak position
Japanese Albums (Oricon)	10
Japan Hot Albums (Billboard)	8
