= Mayday (Coldrain song) =

2019 song by Coldrain

Single by Coldrain featuring Ryo Kinoshita

from the album The Side Effects
- Released: 2 November 2019
- Recorded: February 2019
- Studio: Studio Barbarosa (Orlando, Florida, United States)
- Genre: Metalcore; heavy metal; hard rock
- Length: 3:47
- Label: Warner Music Japan
- Songwriters: Masato Hayakawa; Ryo Yokochi
- Producer: Michael Baskette

Coldrain singles chronology
"The Side Effects" (2019)	"Mayday" (2019)	"See You" (2020)

Music video
- "Mayday" on YouTube

"Mayday" (stylised in all caps) is a song by Japanese rock band Coldrain. It is the fifth single from their sixth studio album The Side Effects, produced by Michael Baskette, written by Masato Hayakawa and Ryo Yokochi, and was released on 2 November 2019. "Mayday" features Ryo Kinoshita from Japanese metalcore band Crystal Lake.

"Mayday" is the second anime opening for Fire Force. Due to the success of the single being on the anime, it started rotating in circles around the metalcore scene elevating the band to new heights. As of 2022, "Mayday" has since been viewed and streamed more than 50 million times worldwide.

== Background ==
"Mayday" was released on November 2, 2019, as the band's fifth single and opening track off their sixth studio album The Side Effects, following the release of the fourth single "The Side Effects" that was released back in August.

In July 2019, following the release of the second single "Coexist", the tracklist was released by the band and was revealed to have a feature by Ryo Kinoshita on the opening track "Mayday". At the end of the following month on August 26, it was announced that "Mayday" would be selected to be the second opening for the anime Fire Force. The guitarist and one of the main songwriters, Ryo Yokochi, would go on to explain the process and collaboration of working on "Mayday" for Fire Force:

"When we got to talk, we got asked for permission, and we were sympathetic to the information that Mr. Okubo often listens to loud music in the early 2000s, and because it was a thing with hope for offensive music, we tried to do it with all our best, the dark side of the original (Shin). I was allowed to create a song with the image of the serious and positive feelings of the members who fought with the past of La and the family of The Big, and such things, and I think that it was finished with a very heavy, cool, and lively feeling, this "Mayday feat. (Ryo from Crystal Lake)" I hope that the world of the work as an OP of the TV anime "Blazing Fire Brigade" (Fire Force) is added to the world view of the work of Coldrain."

== Composition ==
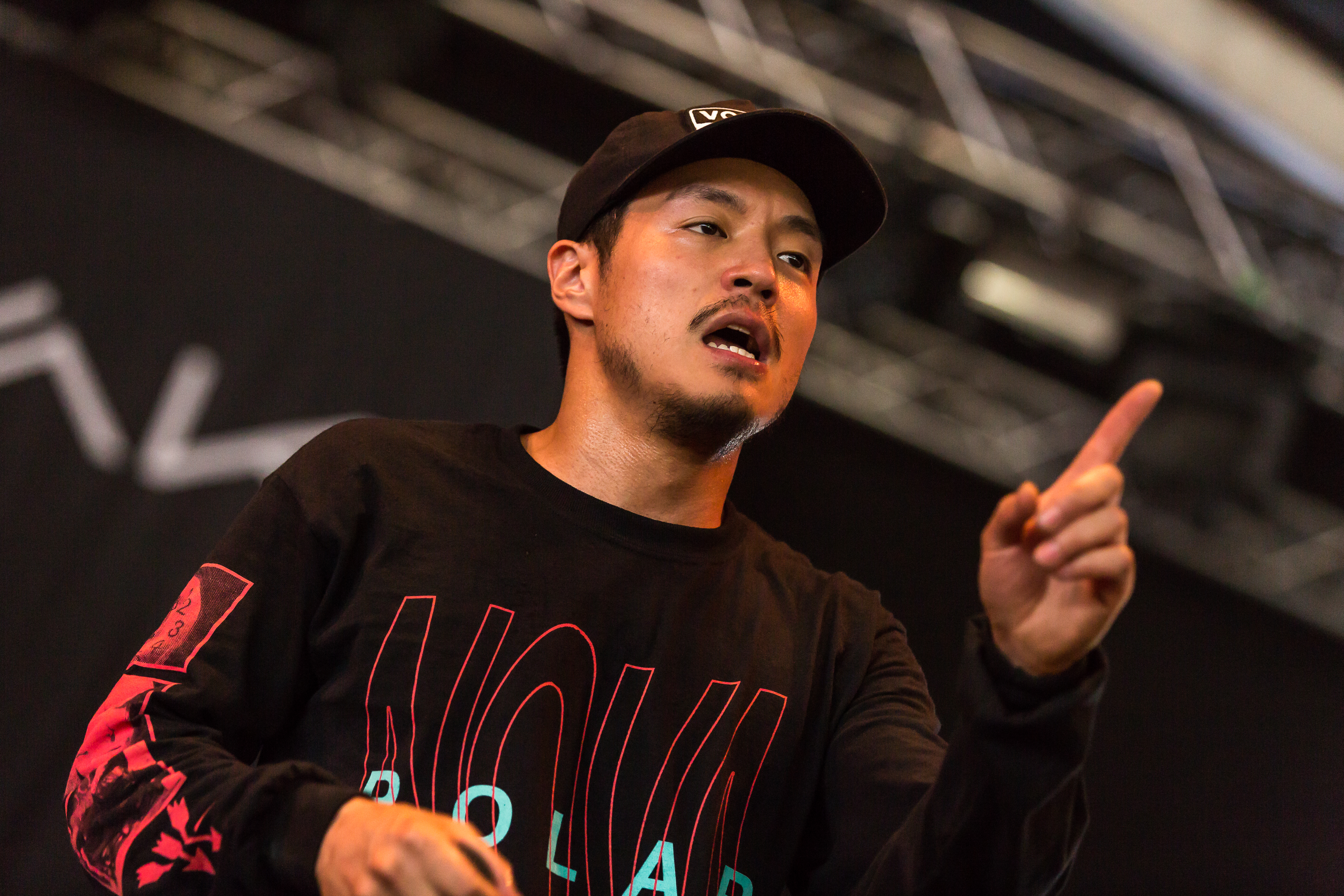
Japanese heavy metal band Crystal Lake's Ryo Kinoshita who features on "Mayday"

"Mayday" is a metalcore, heavy metal, and a hard rock song. The track runs at 121 BPM and is in the key of A♯ minor. It runs for three minutes and 47 seconds. The song was written by Masato Hayakawa and Ryo Yokochi, it was produced by Michael Baskette, with featured vocals from Ryo Kinoshita.

The song's intro samples the Pakistan International Airlines Flight 661 mayday distress signal.

=== Song structure and writing ===
In an interview with Gekirock, Hayakawa would go on to explain the reason for the collaboration with Crystal Lake's, Ryo Kinoshita, on "Mayday" and the decision for having the song being the opening track on The Side Effects.

"I just thought that it was a good fit for the first song, and I didn't think about doing a featured song that much. The part of the featured vocals early on seemed, "Oh, this part is not me, it's Ryo". Ryo told me to call him anytime at various times, so I had him come. I didn't even aim and make it, and I thought that the person I just left to rock was Ryo, so I asked him as it was. I think Ryo also had a fresh face. So, I rewrote it as much as possible and put it in the state of the raw voice that Ryo possesses. At first, he didn't like it, but he showed me the best part for him and for that, I think it became a very pleasant feature."

== Critical reception ==
"Mayday" was an instant hit among fans and critics alike, receiving very positive reviews. Critics noted the impact of Ryo Kinoshita's guest vocals on the song. Suzuki Kayomi of Live Japan Music wrote: ""Mayday" opens the album featuring Crystal Lake singer Ryo Kinoshita, a partnership we had long known when Masato Hayakawa appeared on the single "The Circle". The song didn't let us down, it was the perfect balance of the band's typical chords and Ryo's vocal range." Severin Furer of Morecore would go on to say something similar, though would also talk about the insane catchy infectious chorus. ""Mayday" greets us with a catchy chorus and the strong vocals of the aforementioned Ryo during the bridge."

=== Accolades ===
In 2019, the song was labelled as one of the "Top 25 Anime Opening and Endings of 2019" by J-Rock News. In 2022, Comic Book Resources named "Mayday" as the sixth best anime song to "add to your workout playlist."

== Music video ==
The music video was premiered on November 2, 2019. The music video is directed by Inni Vision, with footage of the band captured performing "Mayday" on their One Man Tour in Japan. The video features Ryo Kinoshita as a special guest who performs the song alongside the band.

== Track listing ==
No.	Title	Lyrics	Music	Length
1.	"Mayday" (feat. Ryo Kinoshita)	Masato Hayakawa	Ryo Yokochi	3:47

== Personnel ==
Credits adapted from Tidal.

Coldrain

- Masato Hayakawa – lead vocals, lyrics
- Ryo Yokochi – lead guitar, programming, composition
- Kazuya Sugiyama – rhythm guitar
- Ryo Shimizu – bass guitar
- Katsuma Minatani – drums

Additional personnel

- Ryo Kinoshita – vocals
- Michael Baskette – producer, mixing, arrangements
- Ted Jensen – mastering
- Jeff Moll – recording engineer
- Joshua Saldate – assistant engineer

== Charts ==
Chart (2019)	Peak positions
Japanese Daily Hot 100	44
Japanese Weekly	113
