= Masato Hayakawa =

Japanese musician, singer and songwriter (born 1986)

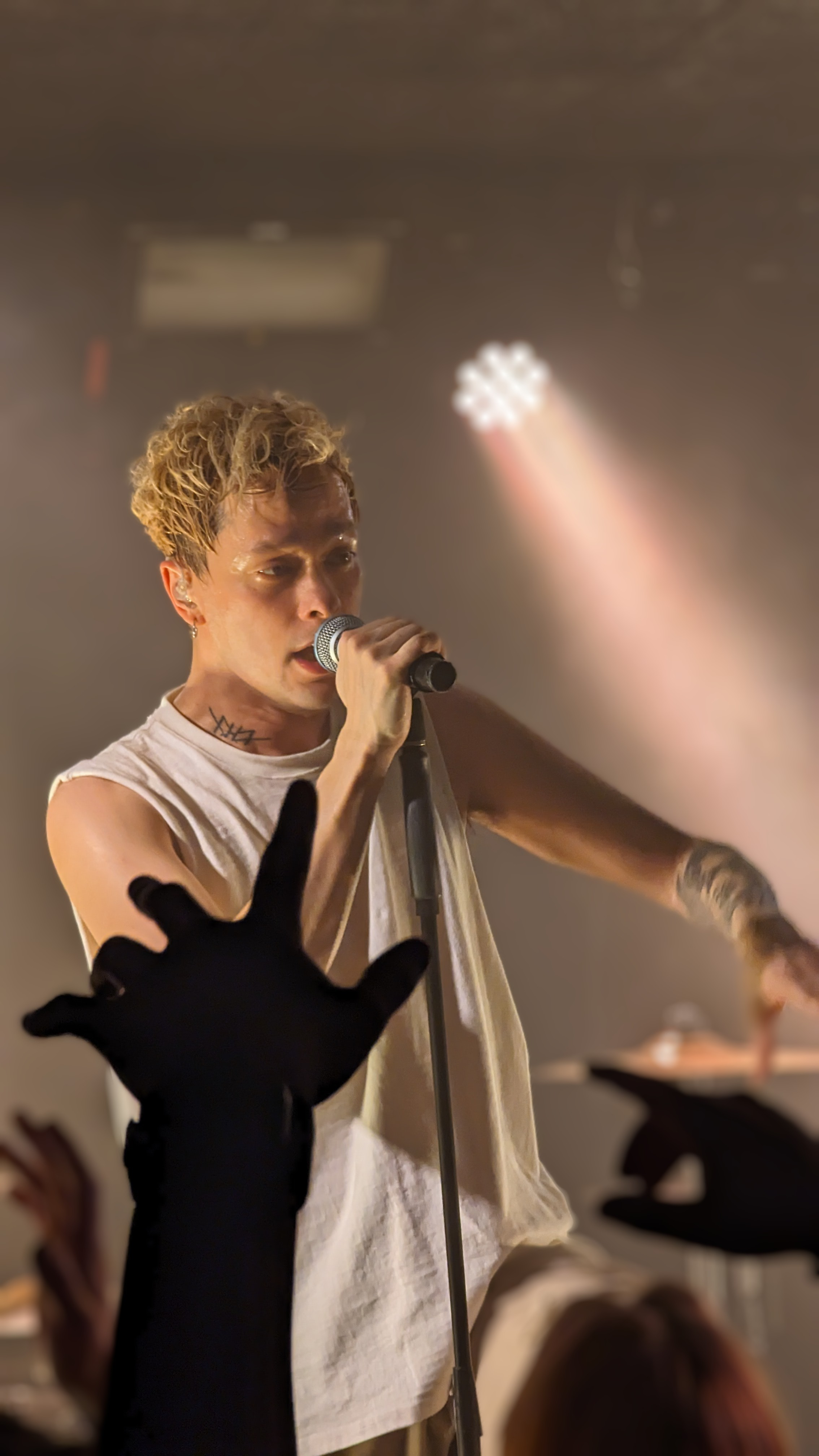
- Hayakawa performing live in Paris, France in 2024

Background information
- Born: Masato David Hayakawa; December 17, 1986 (age 39); Nagoya, Aichi, Japan
- Genres: Post-hardcore; metalcore; alternative metal; alternative rock; hard rock; punk rock
- Occupations: Musician; singer; songwriter; producer; model
- Instruments: Vocals; guitar
- Years active: 2001–present
- Member of: Coldrain
- Formerly of: AVER
- Spouse: Hanna Kelk (m. 2019)

Masato David Hayakawa (早川 雅人, Hayakawa Masato) (born December 17, 1986), known professionally as Masato, is a Japanese-American singer, musician, songwriter, producer and model. He is known for being the bandleader and vocalist of the Japanese rock band Coldrain since their formation in 2007. He was a former member of AVER, alongside one of his fellow Coldrain members, drummer Katsuma Minatani.

Hayakawa is also known as being the director and designer of a clothing line, as well as being a model for Over(all) Tokyo.

== Early life ==
Masato David Hayakawa was born on December 17, 1986, in Nagoya, Japan. He was born to an American mother from Iowa and a Japanese father who was born in Niigata.

He was taught to speak English at a young age by his mother, who was an English teacher. All of this has helped him to become fluent in English as well as Japanese. Hayakawa has stated that he hated it at the time but is very grateful for it now.

This duality in his family made Hayakawa fly out to the United States every summer. On one of these vacations, he saw Limp Bizkit and Korn music videos on MTV as a 13-year-old, later calling them "very cool" and the reason for his realisation of his profession.

Hayakawa started to learn how to play the guitar in his second year of middle school. He later attended Nanzan University in Nagoya, studying law in hopes of becoming a sports agent. Hayakawa later dropped out after two and a half years to focus on his career as the frontman of Coldrain.

== Career ==
=== Script of Creation ===
In the early 2000s, Hayakawa met Katsuma Minatani in high school. They quickly became friends and both joined a band called Script of Creation. Hayakawa was the vocalist, Minatani was the drummer, and two unknown members were the guitarists. The band released an independent EP entitled Funeima, which included songs such as "Before and After" and "Without You". However, the band didn't gain any traction and quickly disbanded.

=== AVER ===
After Script of Creation disbanded, Hayakawa and Minatani formed a new band called AVER, where Hayakawa was the lead vocalist and guitarist while Minatani drummed. They produced songs such as "Voices Over Bullets" and regularly played gigs in clubs around their hometown of Nagoya.

After rivalling with another band called Wheel of Life for a while, they decided to make a supergroup of the two most popular local bands in the area due to their similar musical interests and getting to know each other after meeting at rehearsals.

=== Coldrain ===
The band Coldrain formed in 2007, with Hayakawa as the vocalist, Ryo Yokochi and Kazuya Sugiyama as the guitarists, Ryo Shimizu as the bassist, and Minatani as the drummer.

In what was very rare in Japan, Coldrain sang solely in English. This stemmed from Hayakawa feeling more natural singing in English than Japanese due to his early years learning English and traveling between Japan and the United States, and the band's western influences which helped to elevate this sound into their music and translate the energy to Japanese audiences at the time.

The first song they recorded was "Painting", along with two maxi-singles, "Fiction" and "8AM". They handed out demos on the streets to help spread their music through word of mouth and played gigs in high school gyms and clubs. Some of these songs were included on their debut studio album, Final Destination, which was released in the backend of 2009.

Coldrain gained traction after a couple of their songs, "8AM" and "We’re Not Alone", were used as opening themes for two anime: Hajime No Ippo: Challenger and Rainbow: Nisha Rokubō no Shichinin. Another was on the soundtrack for Pro Evolution Soccer 2011, called "Die Tomorrow"; it thus became a staple song. The latter two songs were used on their debut EP, Nothing Lasts Forever, released in the summer of 2010.

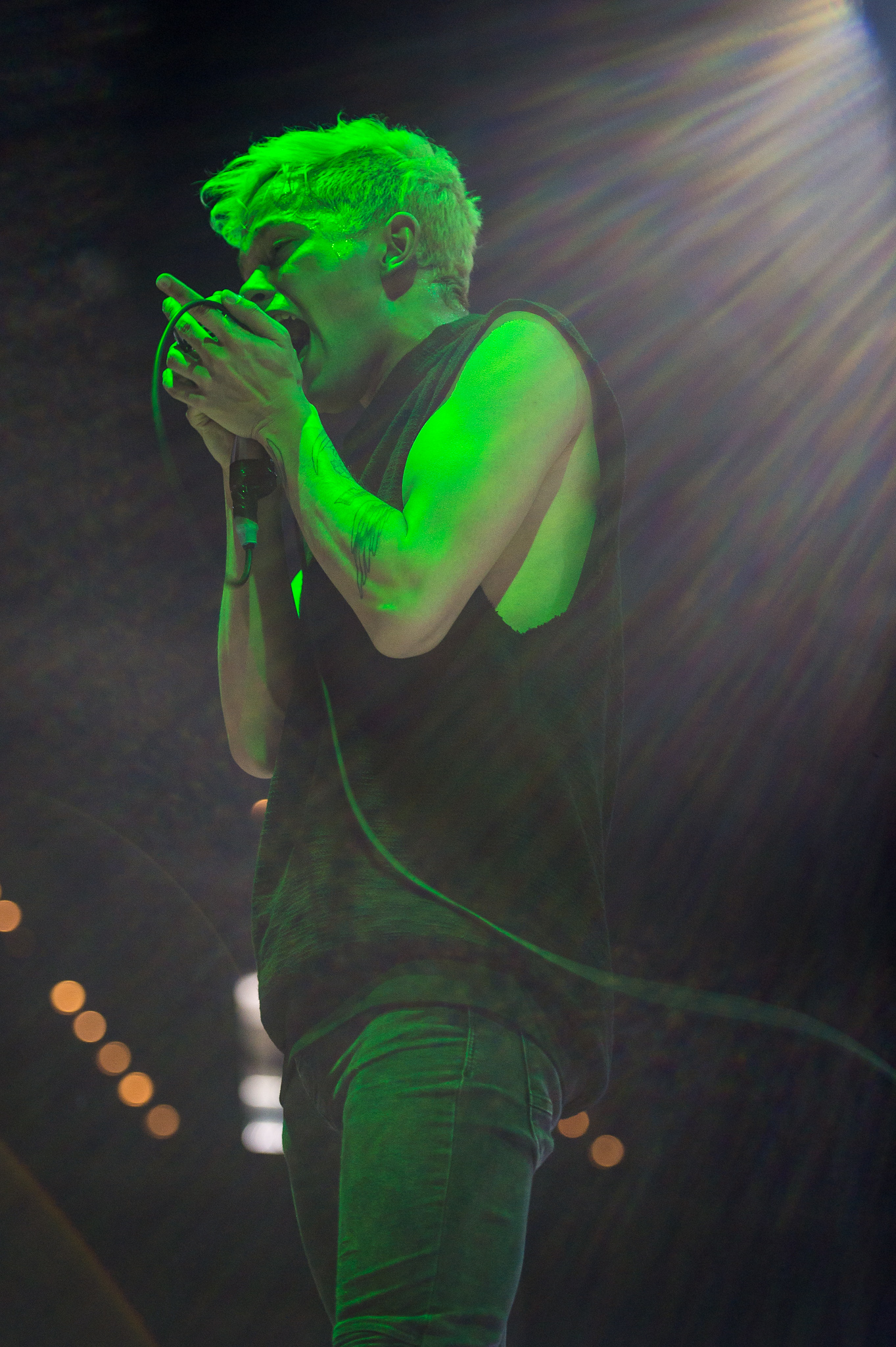
Masato Hayakawa performing at Rock im Park in 2014

Coldrain released two follow-up studio albums, The Enemy Inside and The Revelation. The latter was released worldwide in 2014 as a reissue, including new songs from their Japanese exclusive EP Until The End, following being signed to the North American-based label Hopeless Records that is home to bands such as All Time Low, Avenged Sevenfold and Silverstein. This allowed them to tour all around the world with bands such as Bullet for My Valentine and Papa Roach, as well as playing festivals in Europe such as Download and Rock am Ring.

Vena was the first album released worldwide at its initial release. It featured songs such as "Gone" and "Wrong", as well as a feature from Papa Roach frontman Jacoby Shaddix on "Runaway". The band went on several tours in 2016, including the Warped Tour in the summer. During this time, they released their third maxi-single for the first time since 2009. This was released as Vena: Chapter 2, and featured two new tracks, as well as acoustics of "Gone" and "The Story".

2017 marked Coldrain's 10th anniversary as a band. To coincide with this milestone, they released their fifth studio album Fateless, in October of the same year, as well as a tour that ended with them playing at the famous Nippon Budokan venue. Their performance at Budokan in February 2018 was released as a DVD/Blu-ray.

At the end of 2018, the new single "Revolution" was a tie-in of Gundam: Extreme Vs 2. This tease led to speculation of a new album which was later released as The Side Effects in August 2019. This included other singles such as "Coexist", "January 1st" and the title track. "Mayday", featuring Ryo Kinoshita of metalcore band Crystal Lake, elevated the band. This song became the opening theme for Fire Force. Hayakawa co-wrote One Ok Rock's song "Renegades" alongside Ed Sheeran. It was featured as the official theme song for the Japanese live action film Rurouni Kenshin: The Final.

=== Solo work ===
In 2021, Hayakawa performed his solo song "Remember", which is a theme song used in the anime Jujutsu Kaisen.

== Personal life ==
On October 24, 2019, Hayakawa married professional model Hanna Kelk (born 18 December 1990), who was born in Kagoshima, Japan, and is of Australian descent.

=== Tattoos ===
Hayakawa currently has three tattoos. His mother disapproved of the first, a key, so he got two owls, her favourite animals, on either side of the key to represent the duality of his nationality.

His second tattoo was the symbol from the cover of the band's Nothing Lasts Forever EP, which represents not taking one's life for granted and living it to the fullest. It features an Excalibur type sword with a rose wrapped around it.

A picture of Hayakawa's third tattoo became the cover art for the band's album Vena; in hindsight, he was only too happy of this sacrifice.

== Influences ==
As a child, Hayakawa was influenced by the J-pop scene as well as the music his older brother tended to listen to. Due to these early years as a child, Hayakawa's earliest western and eastern influences consisted of Michael Jackson, Mariah Carey, Hikaru Utada and L'Arc-en-Ciel.

In the nu metal craze in 1999, Hayakawa got into heavier bands, citing this as a critical point of his life which would end up helping him carve his career path. Limp Bizkit and Korn were the first bands he saw on MTV as a teenager, with songs like "Nookie" and "Freak on a Leash" on constant rotation.

His main influences are Hoobastank, Papa Roach, Metallica, Pearl Jam, The Used, Silverchair and Slipknot. He has said that without Sevendust, "Coldrain simply wouldn't exist".

His major influences as a vocalist are Chester Bennington of Linkin Park and Brandon Boyd of Incubus, who were also his two favourite bands growing up.

== Discography ==
=== Coldrain ===
- Final Destination (2009)
- The Enemy Inside (2011)
- The Revelation (2013)
- Vena (2015)
- Fateless (2017)
- The Side Effects (2019)
- Nonnegative (2022)
- Optimize = Optdemise (2026)

=== AVER ===
- "Voices Over Bullets" (2005)

=== Script of Creation ===
- Funeima (2001)

=== Other appearances ===
==== Singles ====
| Song | Year | Artist | Album |
|---|---|---|---|
| "Demise and Kiss" | 2011 | Crossfaith | The Dream, the Space |
| "Dead Dust" | 2013 | Before My Life Fails | (For)Lorn |
| "Resurrection" (also Hazuki of Lynch) | 2013 | Pay Money to My Pain | Gene |
| "Free the Monster" (also featuring Kenta Koie of Crossfaith) | 2016 | AA= | Free the Monster |
| "Skyfall" (also featuring Mah of SiM, and Kenta Koie of Crossfaith) | 2017 | One Ok Rock | Non-album single |
| "Bumps in the Night" | 2017 | Miyavi | Samurai Sessions Vol. 2 |
| "Faint" | 2018 | Crossfaith | Ex Machina |
| "The Circle" | 2019 | Crystal Lake | Non-album single |
| "Chemical Heart" | 2020 | Five New Old | Music Wardrobe |
| "Damage Control" | 2021 | Annalynn | A Conversation With Evil |
| "Rumble" | 2023 | Paledusk | Palehell |
| "Dunk" | 2024 | The Oral Cigarettes | AlterGeist0000 |
| "All We Have" | 2024 | Nothing's Carved in Stone | Fire Inside Us |
| "Supernatural" | 2024 | Noisemaker | Non-album single |
| "Speak of the Devil" | 2026 | Survive Said the Prophet | Fire Force Season 3 Ending Theme |
| "Zion" | 2026 | SiM | Hooman After All |

==== Music videos ====
| Song | Year | Artist | Album | Director | Type | Link |
|---|---|---|---|---|---|---|
| "Baseball Bat" | 2020 | SiM | Thank God, There Are Hundreds of Ways to Kill Enemies | Inni Vision | Performance | |

== Accolades ==
| Publication | Accolade | Year | Rank | Ref. |
|---|---|---|---|---|
| Metal Shout | Best Clean Metalcore Vocalists of All Time | 2023 | 13 | |
