= Vena (album) =

Studio album by Coldrain
- Released: October 21, 2015
- Recorded: June – July 2015
- Studios: Trojan House and Madden Brothers Studio (Los Angeles, California, US)
- Genres: Post-hardcore; metalcore; alternative metal; alternative rock; hard rock; pop
- Length: 38:27
- Labels: VAP; Hopeless
- Producer: Brandon Paddock

Coldrain chronology
Until the End (2014)	Vena (2015)	Vena II (2016)

Singles from Vena
- 1. "Words of the Youth" Released: August 28, 2015; 2. "Gone" Released: September 16, 2015; 3. "Wrong" Released: January 6, 2016; 4. "The Story" Released: May 4, 2016; 5. "Fire in the Sky" Released: July 27, 2016

Vena (stylised in all caps) is the fourth studio album by Japanese rock band Coldrain. Recorded at the Trojan House and Madden Brothers Studio in Los Angeles, California with producer Brandon Paddock. It was released on October 21, 2015, in Japan by VAP and on October 23, 2015, worldwide by independent North American label Hopeless Records.

Vena is the second Coldrain album to be released by Hopeless Records, the first being The Revelation, and the fourth album by the band to be released in Japan by VAP. This would be the follow-up to 2013's The Revelation, also to be the first album released worldwide in 2014. It would be their third highest-charting album on the Oricon Albums Chart, debuting and peaking at number 9, only behind Fateless which peaked at number 8 and The Revelation, which peaked at number 7.

The album spawned five singles, two of which that were released prior to the release of Vena. "Words of the Youth" in August and "Gone" the following month. The latter getting substantial air play on radio stations in the United Kingdom and the United States. The following three singles would all be released in 2016, with "Wrong" being released in January, "The Story" in May and the final single "Fire in the Sky", being released on July 27.

Like its predecessor The Revelation. Vena maintains alternative metal elements which were established in The Revelation, while continuing to further refine their sound and often swaying into a style that is known as metalcore in several songs such as "Wrong", "Words of the Youth", "Fire in the Sky" and "Runaway", that would end up featuring Jacoby Shaddix from the Grammy Award nominated rock band Papa Roach on the record that runs a little over 38 minutes long.

== Background ==
For a good while on social media platforms such as Twitter and Facebook. Cryptic tweets would be up such as a random thing about "The calm before the storm", before being followed up with "big things are coming". This would lead to speculation of a new studio album, as well with the band later sharing a strange looking logo that would eventually end up being the tattoo on the album cover.

"Words of the Youth" would later be released as a promotional and downloadable single on August 28, along with the news of the album title, tracklist, album release date and a world tour. However, later teases would also hint at a new music video for the song "Gone". This would end up being released on September 16 and would come out to critical acclaim and get major radio airplay on Octane, BBC Radio One and Kerrang. The band would start promoting the album by playing the lead single "Gone" on tour with Bullet for My Valentine and While She Sleeps on a European Tour in September and October 2015.

== Composition ==
The band's 2015 effort Vena has been critically described as post-hardcore, metalcore, hard rock, alternative rock, alternative metal, and pop.

== Critical reception ==
Professional ratings
Review scores
Source	Rating
Kerrang!	6/10
Already Heard	3/5 stars
Louder Sound	3.5/5 stars
Mosh	6/10
Pure Grain Audio	7/10
The Sound Board	7/10

The album received mixed-to-positive reviews from several critics.

Luke Nuttall of The Sound Board rated the album 7/10 and commented: "On this, their fourth album, the sound that Coldrain have gone for doesn't deviate much from what they've tried in the past. Vena is largely a collection of thoroughly modern hard rock, polished up but not entirely without grit and with the odd metalcore flourish appearing throughout. Largely though, the focus is on their sound's melodic aspect, a wise move considering that's what they're undeniably best at. It's hardly the most original concept – a sort of midpoint between Bullet for My Valentine and Thirty Seconds to Mars – but in terms of what they aim for, they hit all the right targets. The likes of "Divine" and "The Story" have enough stormy bluster in their choruses to show exactly why this band are such a huge deal in their home country, while "Runaway" gallops along with deft riffs before Papa Roach frontman Jacoby Shaddix arrives to steal the show with yet another barnstorming guest appearance to add to his ever growing list."

Ali Cooper of Already Heard rated the album 3/5 and stated: "Beyond the eventless brevity of chaotic opening title track, vocalist Masato Hayakawa pours every ounce of anguish behind melodic cleans and suffering screams throughout ‘Wrong’, just the start of a cleverly produced record depicting the damage of a broken heart and a broken mind. Instrumental blueprints laid by their Hopeless Records neighbours The Used burst through the distortion-laden ‘Divine’, while the sassy and dominant ‘Pretty Little Liar’ stands tall despite drawing more than a passing resemblance to the aforementioned's ‘Pretty Handsome Awkward’."

The aforementioned critics focused more on the aggressive riffs and harsh vocals of frontman Masato Hayakawa. However, Johnathan Markwell of Mosh went on to compliment the beautiful melancholic vocals: "This is most noticeable with lead singer Masato Hayakawa who is able to go from truly aggressive scream vocals to completely melodic chrooning, and he performs pretty much flawlessly. The second half of the album sees some less aggressive tracks and sees Hayakawa focus on his incredible melodic voice such as in ‘The Story’ and ‘Whole’."

== Commercial performance ==
Vena was the second album by the band to peak within the Top 10 on the Oricon Albums Chart, debuting at number 9, selling 8,714 copies in its first week, while spending a total of six weeks on the chart. On the Billboard Top Album Sales chart, Vena debuted at number 10, dropping by 33 chart positions to number 43 the following week. It would spend a total of three weeks within the Top 100. As of January 2022, it is the fifth best selling album by the band in Japan.

Outside of their home country of Japan, Vena charted in the United Kingdom on the UK Independent Album Breakers Chart for a solitary week at number 15, while also being the tenth biggest best seller in independent retailers that week in the whole country. Despite this, it however failed to crack the UK Albums Chart.

In the United States, Vena sold only 310 copies in its first week, failing to chart on Billboard charts in any capacity.

== Track listing ==
All lyrics written by Masato Hayakawa, all music composed by Masato Hayakawa, Ryo Yokochi and Brandon Paddock, except when noted.

Vena track listing
No.	Title	Writer(s)	Length
1.	"Vena"		0:58
2.	"Wrong"		3:32
3.	"Divine"		3:36
4.	"Gone"		4:12
5.	"Words of the Youth"		3:31
6.	"The Story"		4:09
7.	"Whole"	Masato Hayakawa; Brandon Paddock; Kazuya Sugiyama	3:45
8.	"Runaway" (featuring Jacoby Shaddix)	Hayakawa; Paddock; Ryo Yokochi; Jacoby Shaddix	3:46
9.	"Pretty Little Liar"		3:46
10.	"Heart of the Young"		3:48
11.	"Fire in the Sky"		3:24
Total length:			38:27

Vena: Chapter 2 deluxe edition
No.	Title	Length
12.	"Born to Bleed"	3:52
13.	"Undertow"	3:29
14.	"Gone" (acoustic)	4:34
15.	"The Story" (acoustic)	4:11
Total length:		54:33

== Personnel ==
Credits adapted from album's liner notes.

Coldrain

- Masato David Hayakawa (マサト, Masato) – lead vocals, lyricist
- Ryo Yokochi (ヨコチ, Y.K.C.) – lead guitar, programming, keyboards, composer
- Kazuya Sugiyama (スギ, Sugi) – rhythm guitar, backing vocals
- Ryo Shimizu (リョウ, RxYxO) – bass guitar, backing vocals
- Katsuma Minatani (カツマ, Katsuma) – drums, percussion

Guest feature

- Jacoby Shaddix of Papa Roach – guest vocals on "Runaway"

Additional personnel

- Brandon Paddock – producer, mixing
- Ted Jensen – mastering (Mastered at Sterling Sound, NYC)
- Andrew D'Angelo – assistant engineer
- Courtney Ballard – studio manager, second assistant engineer
- Devon Corey – editing, additional tracking
- Emilo Rivera – studio assistant

== Charts ==
Chart performance for Vena
Chart (2015)	Peak position
Japanese Albums (Oricon)	9
Japanese Albums (Billboard)	10
UK Independent Album Breakers (OCC)	15
UK Official Record Stores (OCC)	14

== Release history ==
Region	Date	Format	Label
Japan	October 21, 2015	CD, digital download	VAP
Worldwide	October 23, 2015	CD, digital download	Hopeless
North America	November 21, 2016	Vinyl	Hopeless
Europe	November 21, 2016	Vinyl	Hopeless
