= Crossfaith discography =

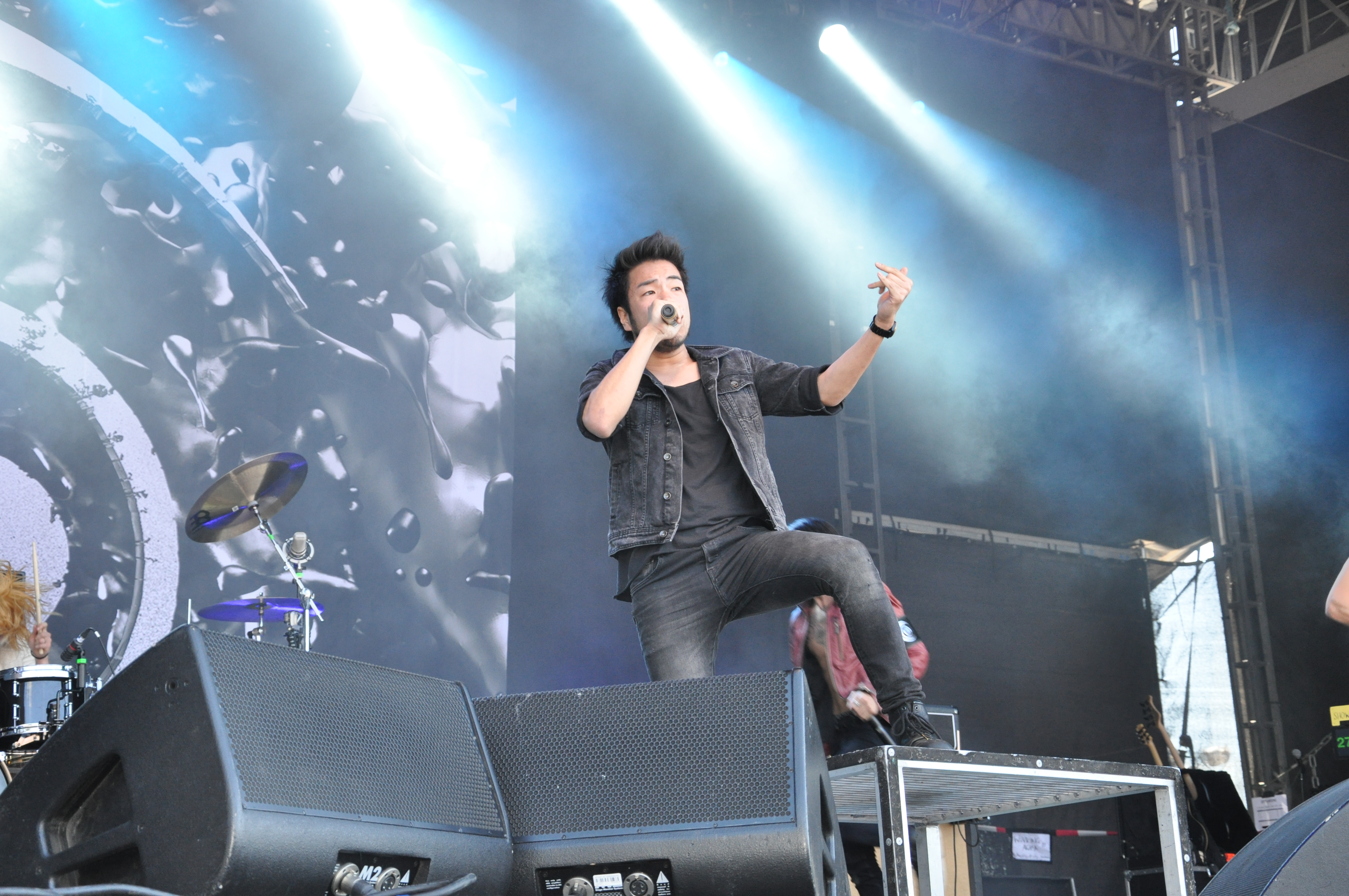
- Crossfaith performing at Rock am Ring in 2014.
- Studio albums: 4
- EPs: 6
- Singles: 27
- Music videos: 29
- Demos: 1
- Other appearances: 8

Crossfaith (クロスフェイス) is a Japanese metalcore band from Osaka that was formed in 2006, consists of Kenta Koie (vocals), Kazuki Takemura (guitar), Hiroki Ikegawa (bass), Tatsuya Amano (drums), and Terufumi Tamano (keyboards). The band released their first demo Blueprint of Reconstruction in 2008, since then they have released 4 studio albums, 1 demo, 6 EPs, 27 singles and 29 music videos.

Their third studio album, Apocalyze, became their first album which charted on US Billboard. It peaked at number 13 on Billboard Heatseekers Albums, and reached number 18 on Billboard Hard Rock Albums.

== Albums ==
=== Studio albums ===
List of studio albums, with selected chart positions
Title	Album details	Peak chart positions					
Title	Album details	JPN Oricon	JPN Billboard	AUS	UK	US Hard Rock	US Heat
The Dream, the Space	Released: 20 April 2011; Label: Zestone Records (JPN), Gan-Shin (EU), Tragic Hero (US); Formats: CD, digital download	67	56	—	—	—	—
Apocalyze	Released: 4 September 2013; Label: Smaller Recordings (JPN), Search and Destroy Records (EU), The End (US), Sony Music; Formats: CD, digital download	19	22	—	137	18	13
Xeno	Released: 16 September 2015; Label: Ariola Japan (JPN), Razor & Tie (EU), UNFD (US); Formats: CD, digital download	14	12	82	136	—	—
Ex Machina	Released: 1 August 2018; Label: Sony Music; Formats: CD, digital download	16	16	—	— (Note: Ex Machina did not enter the UK Albums Chart, but peaked at number 99 on the UK Album Downloads Chart.)	—	—
Ark	Released: 26 June 2024; Label: UNFD; Formats: CD, digital download	33	—	—	—	—	—
"—" denotes items which did not chart.

=== Demos ===
List of demos
Title	Demo details
Blueprint of Reconstruction	Released: 28 August 2008; Label: Self-released; Formats: CD, digital download

== Extended plays ==
List of extended plays, with selected chart positions
Title	EP details	Peak chart positions	
Title	EP details	JPN Oricon	JPN Billboard
The Artificial Theory for the Dramatic Beauty	Released: 29 April 2009; Label: Zestone Records (JPN), Gan-Shin (EU); Formats: CD, digital download	—	—
Zion	Released: 20 June 2012; Label: Zestone Records (JPN), The End (US), Distort (CAN), Halfcut Records (AUS); Formats: CD, digital download	38	39
Freedom	Released: 2 August 2017; Label: Sony Music; Formats: CD, digital download	21	—
Wipeout	Released: 26 January 2018; Label: UNFD; Formats: CD, digital download	—	—
Species	Released: 20 May 2020; Label: UNFD; Formats: CD, digital download	13	20
Kids Still Want a New Acid	Released: 11 December 2020; Label: UNFD; Formats: CD, digital download	—	—
"—" denotes items which did not chart.

== Singles ==
List of singles, with selected chart positions
Title	Year	Peak positions	Album
Title	Year	JPN Oricon	Album
"Monolith"	2012	—	Zion
"Jägerbomb"	2012	—	Zion
"We Are the Future"	2013	—	Apocalyze
"Countdown to Hell"	2013	—	Apocalyze
"Madness"	2014	15	Non-album single
"Ghost in the Mirror" (featuring Caleb Shomo of Beartooth)	2015	—	Xeno
"Xeno"	2015	—	Xeno
"Devil's Party"	2015	—	Xeno
"New Age Warriors"	2016	30	Non-album single
"Freedom" (featuring Rou Reynolds of Enter Shikari)	2017	21	Freedom
"Wipeout"	2018	22	Wipeout
"The Perfect Nightmare"	2018	—	Ex Machina
"Catastrophe"	2018	—	Ex Machina
"Wipeout" (Album mix)	2018	—	Ex Machina
"Make a Move"	2018	—	Ex Machina
"Soul Seeker"	2018	—	Non-album single
"Endorphin"	2020	—	Species
"Digital Parasite"	2020	—	Species
"None of Your Business" (featuring Jin Dogg)	2020	—	Species
"Dead or Alive"	2021	—	Non-album singles
"RedZone"	2021	—	Non-album singles
"Slave of Chaos"	2021	—	Non-album singles
"Feel Alive"	2021	—	Non-album singles
"Gimme Danger" (featuring Ralph)	2022	—	Non-album singles
"Zero"	2024	—	AЯK
"L.A.M.N" (featuring Bobby Wolfgang)	2024	—	AЯK
"God Speed" (featuring Wargasm)	2024	—	AЯK
"—" denotes items which did not chart.

== Music videos ==
Song	Year	Album	Director^{α}	Type	Link
"Blue"	2009	The Artificial Theory for the Dramatic Beauty	Maxilla	Live performance	
"Fiction in Hope"	2009	The Artificial Theory for the Dramatic Beauty	Maxilla	Performance	
"Stars Faded in Slow Motion"	2011	The Dream, the Space	Maxilla	Performance	
"Snake Code (Caribbean Death Roulette)"	2011	The Dream, the Space	Maxilla	Live footage	
"Monolith"	2012	Zion	Maxilla	Performance	
"Jägerbomb"	2013	Zion	INNI VISION	Live footage	
"Omen" (The Prodigy cover)	2013	The Dream, the Space	Maxilla	Performance	
"Photosphere"	2013	Zion	INNI VISION	Live performance	
"We Are the Future"	2013	Apocalyze	Maxilla	Performance	
"Eclipse"	2013	Apocalyze	INNI VISION	Performance	
"Countdown to Hell"	2013	Apocalyze	INNI VISION	Live performance	
"Scarlett"	2013	Apocalyze	INNI VISION	Live performance	
"The Evolution"	2014	Apocalyze	INNI VISION	Narrative	
"Madness"	2014	Non-album single	Maxilla	Performance	
"Devil's Party"	2015	Xeno	Maxilla	Narrative	
"Wildfire" (featuring Benji Webbe of Skindred)	2016	Xeno	Unknown	Live performance	
"Rx Overdrive"	2016	Non-album single	Maxilla	Narrative	
"Freedom" (featuring Rou Reynolds of Enter Shikari)	2017	Freedom	Taichi Kimura	Narrative	
"Rockstar Steady" (featuring Jesse McFaddin of The Bonez/Rize)	2017	Freedom	Spikey John	Narrative	
"Wipeout"	2018	Ex Machina	Jason Eshraghian	Narrative	
"Catastrophe"	2018	Ex Machina	Maxilla	Narrative	
"Make a Move"	2018	Ex Machina	Sam Leabo	Live performance	
"Destroy" (featuring Ho99o9)	2018	Ex Machina	Unknown	Live performance	
"Endorphin"	2020	Species	Taichi Kimura	Performance	
"Digital Parasite"	2020	Species	Takasuke Kato	Narrative	
"None of Your Business" (featuring Jin Dogg)	2020	Species	Takasuke Kato	Narrative	
"Gimme Danger" (featuring Ralph)	2022	Non-album single	Takahito Matsuno	Performance	
"Zero"	2024	AЯK	Takasuke Kato	Performance	
"God Speed" (featuring Wargasm)	2024	AЯK	Takasuke Kato	Performance	
^α = Are referenced in the description of the given video link.

== Other appearances ==
=== Singles ===
Song	Year	Artist
"No Plan B" (featuring Koie Kenta)	2010	Manafest
"Born Ready" (featuring Koie Kenta)	2011	Fade
"Prayers" (featuring Koie Kenta)	2012	Before My Life Falls
"Respect for the Dead Man" (featuring Koie Kenta and Terufumi Tamano)	2013	Pay Money to My Pain
"Faith" (featuring Koie Kenta)	2013	SiM
"Beloved" (featuring Koie Kenta)	2013	Crystal Lake
"Anger" (featuring Koie Kenta)	2016	The Qemists
"Skyfall" (featuring Koie Kenta, MAH of SiM, and Masato Hayakawa of Coldrain)	2017	One Ok Rock

=== Music videos ===
Year	Song	Artist	Director	Link
2020	"Baseball Bat"	SiM	Inni Vision	
