= VOT =

VOT may refer to:

- Value of time, the opportunity cost of time expended in some activity
- Voice Of Tranquility, a female fronted rock and metal band from the Philippines
- Vampire on Titus, an album by Dayton Indie rock band Guided by Voices
- VHF omnidirectional range
- Video on Trial, a television show by MuchMusic
- Voice onset time
- Votic language
