= Species (EP) =

EP by Crossfaith
- Released: 20 May 2020
- Genre: Metalcore; electronicore; electronica
- Length: 17:30
- Label: UNFD

Crossfaith chronology
Ex Machina (2018)	Species (2020)	Ark (2024)

Singles from Species
- 1. "Endorphin" Released: 5 February 2020; 2. "Digital Parasite" Released: 9 April 2020; 3. "None of Your Business" Released: 26 June 2020

Species is the fifth EP by Japanese metalcore band Crossfaith. It was released on 20 May 2020 in Japan, and later released on 22 May 2020 worldwide.

== Background and promotion ==
Crossfaith debuted their first single "Endorphin" exclusively on Daniel P. Carter's BBC Radio 1 Rock Show, the day before the release of the single worldwide. However, the EP wasn't announced until the release of the second single "Digital Parasite" on 9 April 2020.

In an interview with Rock Sound, the frontman, Kenta Koie would explain that Species would alter the course of the band for "at the very least for the next 10 years". He would further go on to explain about the departure in sound from Ex Machina to Species:

We always try and have a specific concept for our albums, but this time we went about trying to make each individual song stronger than ever before. The experience of doing that was actually really nice because with putting a concept together it's hard to actually finish it. There are barriers that have specific links to the concept you're building. This time though it was much more free. Music is there for thinking and the inspiration always comes from the soul. This EP is more pure because of that compared to what we have done on our previous albums.

— Kenta Koie,

== Critical reception ==
Professional ratings
Review scores
Source	Rating
Dead Press!	7/10
Distorted Sound	8/10
Kerrang!	2/5 stars
Metal Hammer	75/100
Wall of Sound	8/10

The EP received mostly positive reviews, but also mixed reviews from several critics. Carlos Zelaya from Dead Press! rated the EP positively calling it: "Wasting no time and still managing to spring surprises with their multi-dimensional sound, Crossfaith continue to impress with Species." Distorted Sound scored the EP 8 out of 10 and said: "In recent times CROSSFAITH have branched out their sound in a variety of different directions whilst continuing to stay cohesive and true to all the invigorating elements that brought them such adoration throughout their journey. Species is a compacted burst packed with fury and fun that will greatly please their existing fans as well as grab the attention of any potential newcomers. If you're new to the weird and wonderful world of CROSSFAITH this is the ideal appetiser to get you acquainted."

In a less favourable review, Kerrang! gave the EP 2 out of 5 and stated: "Overall, Species hasn't evolved enough to justify its existence." Wall of Sound gave the EP a score 8/10 and saying: "Crossfaith continue to be a dominant outfit among Japan's heavy music scene. It will be interesting to see what kind of live show for SPECIES they bring back to Australia, because their last outing made them an unmissable band in my book."

== Track listing ==
No.	Title	Length
1.	"Digital Parasite"	2:45
2.	"Endorphin"	3:18
3.	"Truth of Insanity"	3:25
4.	"None of Your Business" (featuring Jin Dogg)	3:57
5.	"Your Song"	4:05
Total length:		17:30

== Personnel ==
Crossfaith

- Kenta Koie – lead vocals
- Kazuki Takemura – guitars
- Terufumi Tamano – keyboards, programming, samples, backing vocals
- Hiroki Ikegawa – bass
- Tatsuya Amano – drums

Additional musicians

- Jin Dogg – guest vocals on "None of Your Business"

== Charts ==
Chart performance for Species
Chart (2020)	Peak position
Japanese Albums (Billboard)	20
Japanese Albums (Oricon)	13

== Release history ==
Region	Date	Format	Label
Japan	20 May 2020	CD, digital download	UNFD
Worldwide	22 May 2020	CD, digital download	UNFD
