= Amelie Lens =

Belgian DJ and record producer

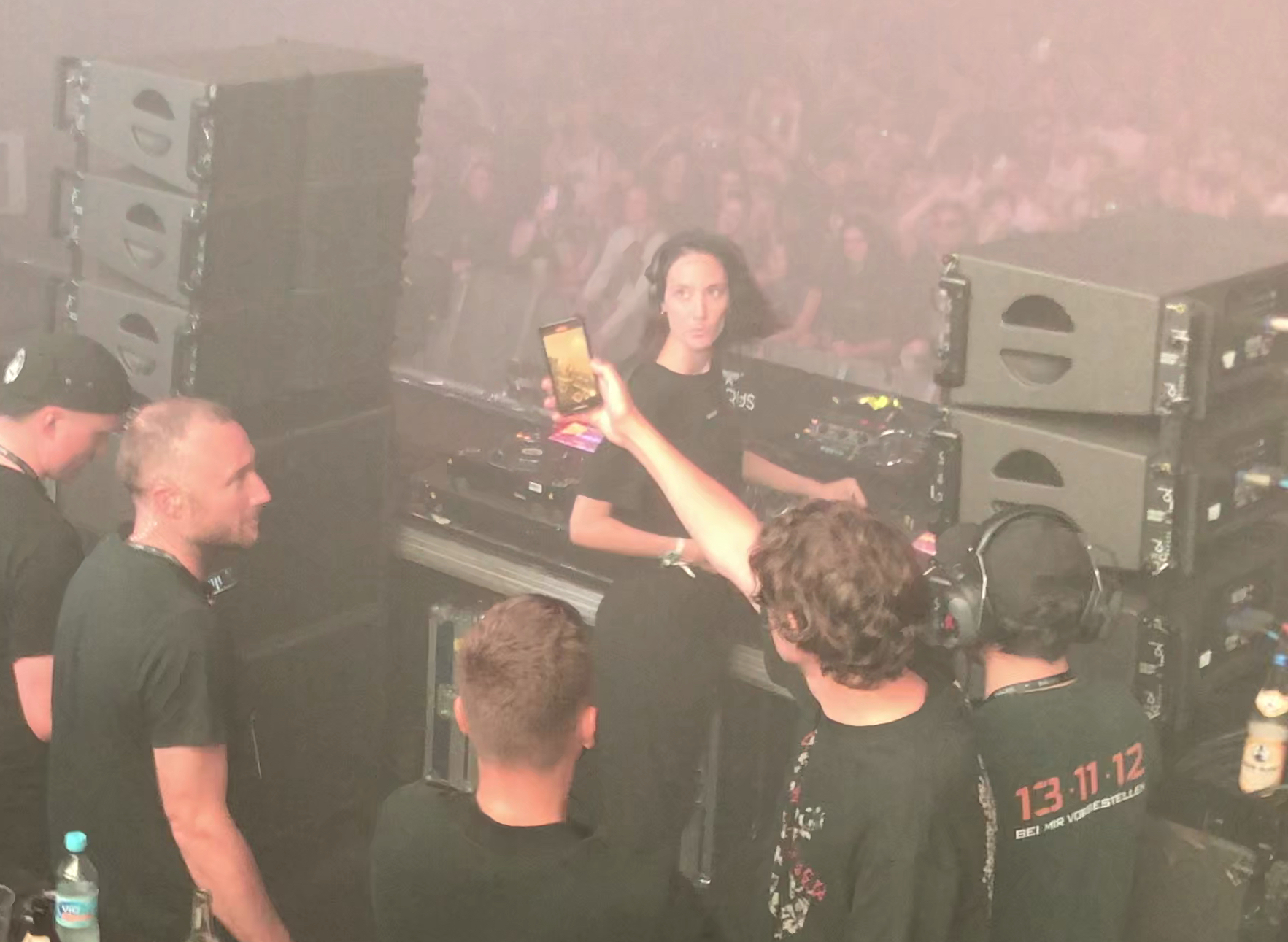
- Lens in 2022

Background information
- Born: 31 May 1990 (age 36); Vilvoorde, Flemish Brabant, Belgium
- Genre: Techno
- Occupations: Disc jockey, record producer
- Years active: 2014–present
- Labels: Lenske, Second State
- Spouse: Sam Deliaert
- Website: amelielens.com

Amelie Lens (Flemish: [aːmeːˈli ˈlɛns], French: [ameli lɑ̃s]; born 31 May 1990) is a Belgian electronic music DJ, record producer, and owner of the techno record labels EXHALE and Lenske.

== Early life ==
Amelie Lens was born in Vilvoorde, Belgium. She was raised by her grandmother beginning at the age of five, following the death of her mother. She went to art school in Antwerp. From an early age, she had a diverse interest in music, citing Nine Inch Nails, Underworld, Boys Noize and Ellen Allien as early influences.

Lens became absorbed in electronic music at 15, after attending the 2005 Dour Festival in Belgium, an experience she describes as "life-changing". She says: "As soon as I got home, I started reading about the history of electronic music and discovered so many new artists and labels. It was like a whole new world opened for me; I made playlists in iTunes, putting tracks in an order that I liked, kind of like a podcast but not mixed.

Shortly after the festival, Lens was discovered by a modeling agency and subsequently began working full-time as a model, living in London, Paris and Milan. She has walked the runway for Jean Paul Gaultier and campaigned for H&M.

== Career ==
During her career as a model, Lens was working free-time as a DJ under the name Renée, her late mother's name, earning herself a residency at the Labyrinth Club in Hasselt, Belgium in 2013. She played mostly bass-heavy minimal techno. She gave up her work in the fashion industry in 2014, focusing fully on her musical career. At this time, she also began using her real name.

In 2016, her first track "Exhale" was released on Italian imprint Lyase Recordings. Soon after a trio of releases on Pan-Pot's Second State and a collab EP with Regal on Involve Records followed. In 2018, she launched her own label called Lenske. As a resident at Hasselt's Labyrinth Club, Lens started curating her own nights under the name EXHALE. Lens has expanded the EXHALE parties further afield, with regular showcases at the London's Fabric club and at Creamfields, OFFSonar, Dour and Extrema festivals.

Her debut studio album, Aura, is scheduled to release in September 2026.

== Personal life ==
Lens married her longtime boyfriend Sam Deliaert, who is also active as a DJ under the stage name Farrago, in summer 2022. In December 2023, Lens gave birth to a daughter.

== Musical sound and equipment ==
She describes her sound as "very energetic, but not always that 'hard'. I see myself as floating around somewhere between several subgenres of techno".

She often plays live using a Pioneer RMX 1000. Lens says she uses the effects box "to add layers to the mix. It has a built-in sampler and personalised effects that can entirely reform the track that is playing. Like everything, its use is situational. Sometimes I hardly touch it, but when I play a peak-time set it truly shines. I specifically look for and buy tracks that will work well with the device. Very stripped-down or minimalistic percussion locked grooves." While producing, Amelie uses Ableton Live DAW, as well as the Elektron Analog Four synth and sequencer.

== Discography ==
- 2016: Exhale
- 2016: Let it Go (Second State)
- 2017: Contradiction (Second State)
- 2017: Stay With Me (Second State)
- 2017: Nel (Elevate)
- 2018: Amelie Lens & Farrago - Weight Of The Land (Arts)
- 2018: Regal / Amelie Lens - INVOLVE 020 (Involve)
- 2018: Basiel (Lenske)
- 2019: Teach Me (Amelie Lens Remixes) (Drumcode)
- 2019: Hypnotized (Second State)
- 2019: Look What Your Love Has Done To Me Remixed (Perc Trax)
- 2019: Litte Robot (Lenske)
- 2019: Fabric Presents Amelie Lens CD-mix compilation (Fabric)
- 2020: Various - The Future (Lenske)
- 2020: Higher (Lenske)
- 2021: Amelie Lens & AIROD - Raver's Heart (Lenske)
- 2022: In My Mind (Lenske)
- 2023: Feel It (EXHALE)
- 2023: Radiance (EXHALE)
- 2023: You and Me (EXHALE)
- 2024: Breathe (EXHALE)
- 2024: Underneath The Strobelights (EXHALE)
- 2026: Aura

== Awards and nominations ==
=== DJ Awards ===
Year	Nominee / Work	Category	Result	Ref.
2018	Amelie Lens	Best Techno Artist	Nominated	
2019	Amelie Lens	Best Techno DJ	Nominated	

=== DJ Mag's top 100 DJs ===
Year	Position	Notes	Ref.
2020	59	New Entry	
2021	44	▲15	
2022	37	▲7	
2023	30	▲7	
2024	41	▼11	
2025	38	▲3	

=== DJ Mag's Alternative top 100 DJs powered by Beatport ===
Year	Position	Notes	Ref.
2018	23	New Entry	
2019	19	▲4	
2020	5	▲14	
2021	6	▼1	

=== International Dance Music Awards ===
Year	Nominee / Work	Category	Result	Ref.
2019	Amelie Lens	Best Techno Artist (Female)	Nominated	
2020	Amelie Lens	Best Techno Artist (Female)	Nominated	

=== Red Bull Elektropedia Awards ===
Year	Nominee / Work	Category	Result	Ref.
2016	Amelie Lens	Breakthrough	1	
2016	Amelie Lens – Exhale	Best Song	2	
2017	Amelie Lens	Best DJ	1	
