= Regal (musician) =

Spanish music producer, DJ and label head of Involve Records

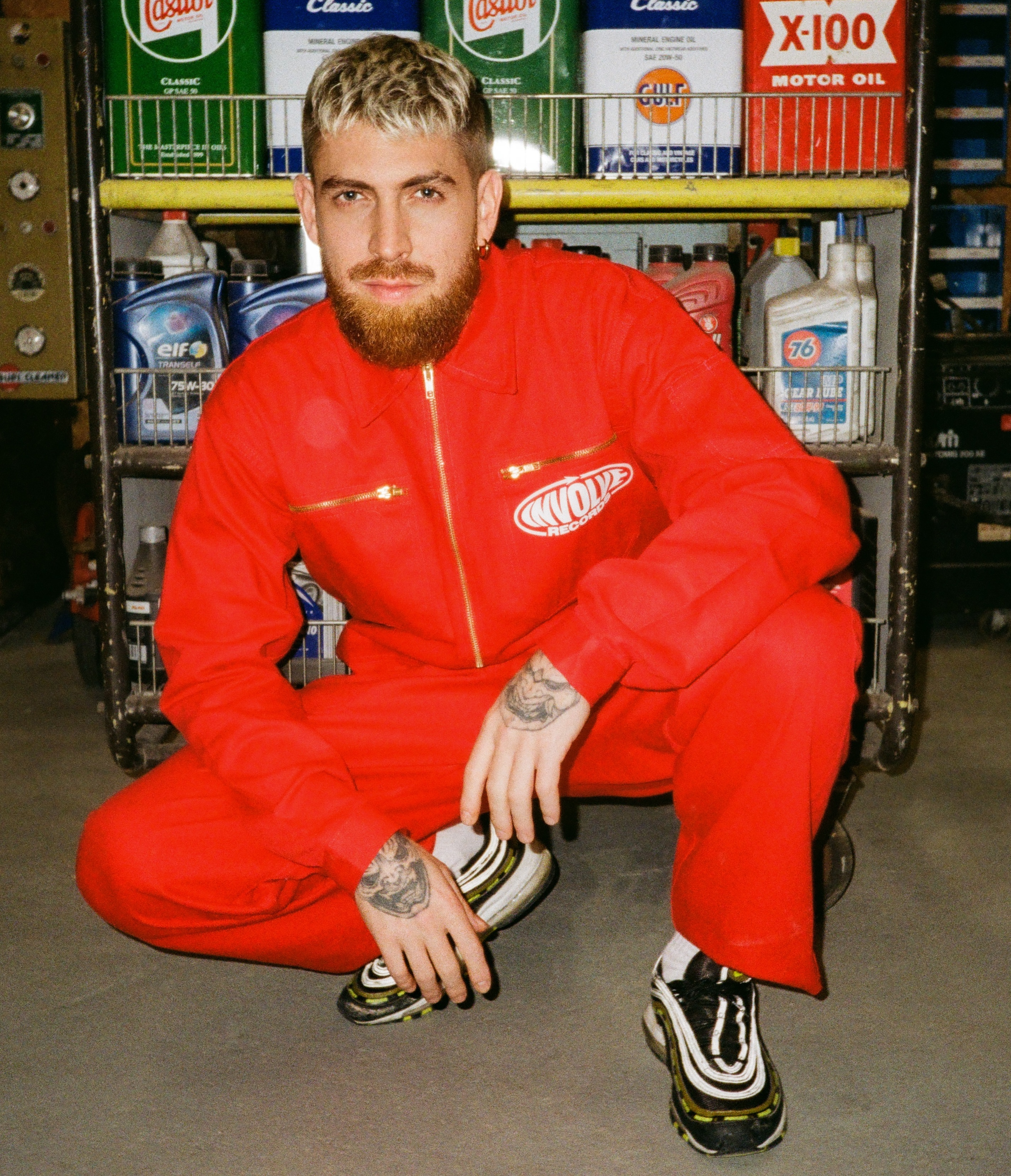

Background information
- Also known as: ACIDBOY
- Born: Gabriel Cassina; 1989 (age 36–37); Madrid, Spain
- Genres: Techno, acid techno, electro
- Occupations: DJ, music producer, record label owner
- Years active: 2012–present
- Labels: Involve, BPitch Control, Figure, Enemy, Exhale
- Website: regalmusic.es

Regal, also known as ACIDBOY, is an electronic music producer and DJ. His sound is eclectic, best categorized as techno or acid techno, but with trance and electro influences. Aside from his solo career, Regal established his record label Involve Records in 2012, which has since signed artists such as Amelie Lens, Ellen Allien, Alignment, Boston 168 and Lady Starlight, to name a few.

== Career ==
Regal was born and raised in Madrid and is of Italian descent. He shot to the forefront of the techno spectrum in 2012, after releasing productions met with widespread critical acclaim by the worldwide techno scene. Besides a string of original releases on his Involve Records imprint, Regal has been signed to labels such as Figure, Enemy, Rekids, BPitch Control and Exhale. The Madrid-based producer has worked on collaborations with artists of the caliber of Len Faki and Amelie Lens.

=== Early years ===
Regal's debut release Mute EP arrived back in 2012 when he was signed to Dustin Zahn's label Enemy. Shortly after he founded his own label Involve and released its first EP Involve 01. In 2016, Figure released a collaboration between Len Faki and Regal entitled The End, marking Regal's third release on the record label at that time. The EP created quite some noise from critics, some even jokingly naming the duo Faki Regal. This led Regal to remix renowned acts like Nina Kraviz and later, in more recent years, Ellen Allien, Emmanuel Top (one of his key early influences) and many more. While, on the other hand, Regal's own productions have been remixed by heavyweight artists such as Mark Broom, Charlotte de Witte or Radio Slave.

=== Recent projects ===
In 2021, following plenty of EP releases on renowned labels and after having been featured on the cover of DJ Mag Spain, Regal released his debut album Remember Why You Started. The album tells the story of his personal struggles and self-discovery, giving insight into the artist's life behind the scenes. The project, an introspection of Regal's story, caught the attention of listeners globally. The album features both tracks he started working on years ago, and some others brand new. When asked his favorite track Regal responded:

Somehow this album is a kind of a showcase of everything I know production-wise, everything I personally like and a way to show people that it’s not always only about classic peak-time bangers. I am proud of the whole album as each track has a soul, a message and a meaning…

Accompanying the LP, Regal produced a short film featuring Patrick Criado, known through the Spanish Netflix series Money Heist. Emotional turmoil and passion resulted in powerful sounds and punchy kicks, acid lines, drum breaks and EBM- and Hip-Hop-leaning tracks, offering the listeners a glimpse into the producer's creative mind. Following the release of Remember Why You Started, three remix EPs were released, featuring reworks from artists such as Slam, Thomas P. Heckmann and Sita Abellán.

In 2024, Regal announced a new 10-track album called The Final Chapter, to be released under his new alias ACIDBOY, a nickname that his fans had given him after his first releases on his label Involve Records. The album was announced along with a special ADE edition cover and in-depth interview on Mixmag Spain.

The title track was released along with a music video produced by Copenhagen-based Franzi Films and accompanied by widespread critical acclaim. The music video, which features Regal and every single role, playing four characters, fuses 90s nostalgia through a reference to the movie Back To The Future, with a DeLorean being the key element of the video, with a tongue-in-cheek analysis of the modern-day techno scene and a parody of how the scene has evolved in recent years.

=== Signature sound ===
Known for his ability to move between genres, he draws from pockets of many sub-genres across the electronic sphere, with tinges of Trance melodies, Electro basslines and Acid undercurrents at the center of his sound.

Regal is a core resident at KHIDI, a popular club in Tbilisi’s techno scene. In an interview with Mixmag, Regal expresses admiration for Tbilisi’s techno scene, describing it as solidifying peace and unity between people. As a DJ, Regal's style has led him to play sets across several clubs and festivals such as Berghain, Fabrik Madrid, Tresor, Awakenings, DGTL, Exhale and many others.

== Involve Records ==
Regal's own label Involve Records, founded back in 2012, has become a core hub for both his solo productions and stand out collaborations with the likes of Alien Rain and Amelie Lens, whilst also welcoming artists such as Boston 168, FJAAK, Cosmin TRG, Bambounou, Z.I.P.P.O, Truncate, Alignment, Fabrizio Rat and many others to the imprint to date.

== Personal life ==
Born in 1989, Regal grew up and lives in Madrid. He expresses his admiration for the city in an interview with Groove: "We don't have [the] sea here, but Madrid is a beautiful city that I know well. For me it is the most beautiful city in the world. A city full of possibilities. Whatever you want to do, you can do it here."

Regal's interest in music was always prevalent, but the serious interest in DJ-ing began in his early teen years, when he started playing around with a demo sequencer that he got with a package of cornflakes, he explains in an interview with Music Radar.

== Discography ==
Over his career, Regal has released a considerable amount of music with a back catalogue consisting of 90 tracks, released on 22 EPs, one album and seven compilations, and numerous remixes.

=== Albums ===
- 2024: The Final Chapter (Involve) [released as ACIDBOY]
- 2021: Remember Why You Started (Involve)

=== EPs ===
- 2026: Regal – Forgotten Heroes (Backspin)
- 2025: Regal – Avalanche (Backspin)
- 2024: Regal – Not Another Summer (Involve)
- 2021: Regal – RWYS Remixes Pt.03 (Involve)
- 2021: Regal – RWYS Remixes Pt.02 (Involve)
- 2021: Regal – RWYS Remixes Pt.01 (Involve)
- 2020: Regal – Ego Wars (Bpitch Control)
- 2019: Regal – The Eyes (Bpitch Control)
- 2019: Regal & Alien Rain – Acid Affair (Involve)
- 2018: Regal – Still Raving (Involve)
- 2018: Regal & Amelie Lens – Involve 20 (Involve)
- 2018: Regal – L’Éternité (Suara)
- 2017: Regal – Trave Generation (Involve)
- 2017: Regal – Acid Is the Answer (Involve)
- 2016: Regal – From Other Sounds (Figure)
- 2016: Regal – Salie (Involve)
- 2016: Regal & Len Faki – The End (Figure)
- 2015: Regal – Symbol (Figure)
- 2015: Regal – Alma Mater (Involve)
- 2014: Regal – Chaos (Involve)
- 2014: Regal – Savage (Enemy)
- 2013: Regal – Involve 01 (Remixes) (Involve)
- 2012: Regal – Involve 01 (Involve)
- 2012: Regal – Mute (Enemy)

=== Compilation appearances ===
- 2023: Regal – Undisputed (Nightclub Pros Vol. 03) (Involve)
- 2023: Regal – Burned Out (Gemstones: Moonstone) (RAW)
- 2021: Regal – True Spirit (Don't Lose Your Smile) (DLYS)
- 2020: Regal – Spreading the Cult (Exhale VA001) (Exhale)
- 2020: Regal – Looking 4 Balance (EP 3) (Possession)
- 2019: Regal – Nasty Boys (UFOx01) (UFO Inc.)
- 2019: Regal & Alignment – Astro (Fabric Presents Amelie Lens) (Fabric)
- 2017: Regal – Send Nudes (5 Years in Love with Involve) (Involve)
- 2014: Regal – Report a Crash (Figure SPC R) (Figure SPC)

=== Remixes ===
- 2023: Chimo Bayo – Asi Me Gusta A Mi (Regal 'La Ruta' Remix) (Involve)
- 2023: J.Y.D. – Nature (Regal 23 Rework) (Involve)
- 2023: Ram-J – Nowhere Bells (Regal 23 Rework) (Involve)
- 2023: I.B.M. presents Monsieur Black – No Love (Regal 23 Rework) (Involve)
- 2022: UMEK – Benozal (Regal 22 Rework) (Involve)
- 2022: D.O.M. – Acid War (Regal 22 Rework) (Involve)
- 2022: AIROD – The Last Of Us (Regal Remix) (Elixyr)
- 2021: Regal – Cult Of Personality (Regal & Sita Abellan Remix) (Involve)
- 2021: Sept – Sensation Seeker (Regal Remix) (Voxnox)
- 2021: Fabrizio Rat – Rave Runner (Regal Remix) (Involve)
- 2021: Marco Bailey – Scorpia (New Legacy Regal Remix) (Suara)
- 2020: Crossfaith – Endorphin (Regal Spitfire Remix) (Species Inc.)
- 2019: Ellen Allien – Electronic Joy (Regal XTC Remix) (Bpitch Control)
- 2019: Alignment – Interference (Regal Remix) (Etruria Beat)
- 2019: PØLI & Lorenzo Raganzini – No Escape (Regal Remix) (HEX)
- 2018: Amelie Lens – Render (Regal Remix) (Involve)
- 2018: Rocko Garoni – Detection (Regal Remix) (Second State)
- 2018: Emmanuel Top – This Is Cocaine (Regal Remix) (Filth On Acid)
- 2017: Giorgia Angiuli – Over The Clouds (Regal Remix) (Suara)
- 2016: Andre Kronert – Ain't No Funny Music (Regal Warehouse Remix) (Odd Even)
- 2016: Andre Kronert – Dirty Old Man (Regal Remix) (Odd Even)
- 2015: Marco Faraone – Black Air (Regal Remix) (On Edge Society)
- 2015: Nina Kraviz – Ghetto Kraviz (Regal 'Sad' Remix) (Rekids)
- 2015: Nina Kraviz – Ghetto Kraviz (Regal 303 Dub) (Rekids)
- 2015: Nina Kraviz – Ghetto Kraviz (Regal 303 Remix) (Rekids)
