= Voice of Tranquility =

Filipino rock and metal band

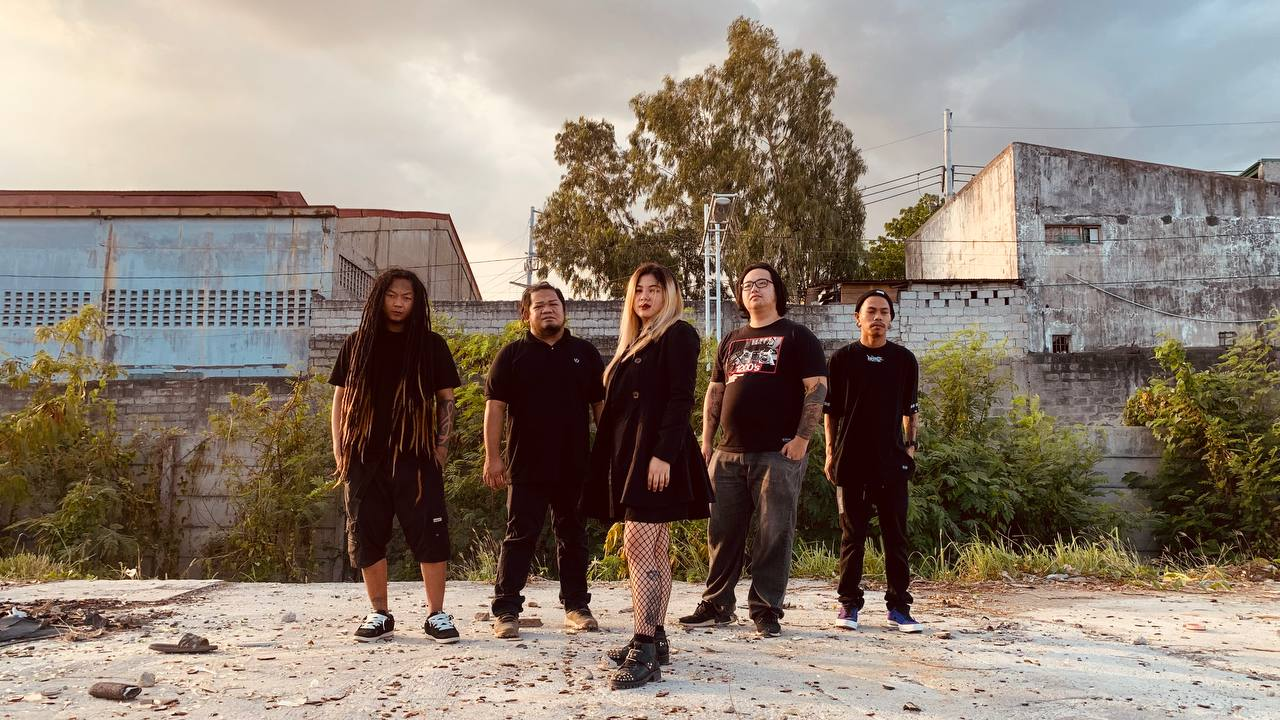
- Voice of Tranquility 2022

Background information
- Origin: Taguig City, Philippines
- Genres: Metal
- Years active: 2003–present
- Labels: Unsigned / Former: Ivory Music and Video
- Members: Trish Cromwell; Kei Deguchi; Val Caroche; Derick De Luna; Jerico Rangas
- Past members: Babie Borja; Alex Sabordo; Phimart Pilande; Dexter Miranda; Gabriel Mendoza; Luther John Oplida; Jhunlee Kim Oplida; Raul Babor; Rex Aiur; Rny Jane Ortega; Carl Justine Morales; Alfredo Molina; Miguel Fontiveros; Deda Willet Dela Cruz; Samad Abubakkar (RIP)
- Website: Voice of Tranquility

Voice of Tranquility is a Filipino rock and metal band formed in 2003 from Taguig City, Philippines and was founded by Val Caroche, along with Rny Jane Demano.

The band played alongside international artists, Anthrax, Hellyeah, Death Angel, Nervecell (UAE), Kreator, Hatebreed, Bullet for my Valentine, Asking Alexandria, Crossfaith (Japan), The Black Dahlia Murder, Goddamn (Norway), Metal Heads with Broken Hearts (Norway), Asian Core (Japan), Desecrator (Australia), Argies (Argentina), Arah Kiri (Malaysia), Harmong Drive (Norway), Deathtopia (Japan).

== History ==
=== Early years (2003–2005) ===
Voice of Tranquility hails from Taguig. The band was originally named Skit back in December 2003, but in the beginning of year 2005 they have decided to rename the band into Paperdoll, halfway of the same year they changed the band name again into Charlotte. The band is composed by a group of high school friends from Saint Francis of Assisi College System-Taguig Campus and St. Ives School in Bagumbayan, Taguig, and was founded by their own drummer, Valentine along with their former vocalist Arnie Jane Demano, former guitarist Philmart Pilande, and former bassist Dexter Miranda who left due to a conflict with their schedules.

=== From Skit to Voice Of Tranquility, Demo CD (2006–2008) ===
Back in December 2006, Valentine decided to change the band label into its present name Voice of Tranquility. Since then, they started playing live shows in the underground scene. They got their first appearance gig around 2006 at Harmony Bar in Ortigas, Pasig. At that time, the band's line-up was-Rny Jane Demano on vocals, Sammad Abubakkar on bass, and on guitars are Raul Babor and the brothers Luther John and Kim Oplida. In the year 2007, they used an mp3 player to record their first raw track demo entitled Anal Sacrifice, which is a cover from their brother band – Almoranaz. In that same year the band got some several line-up changes.

=== The Army of Hades (2009–2010) ===
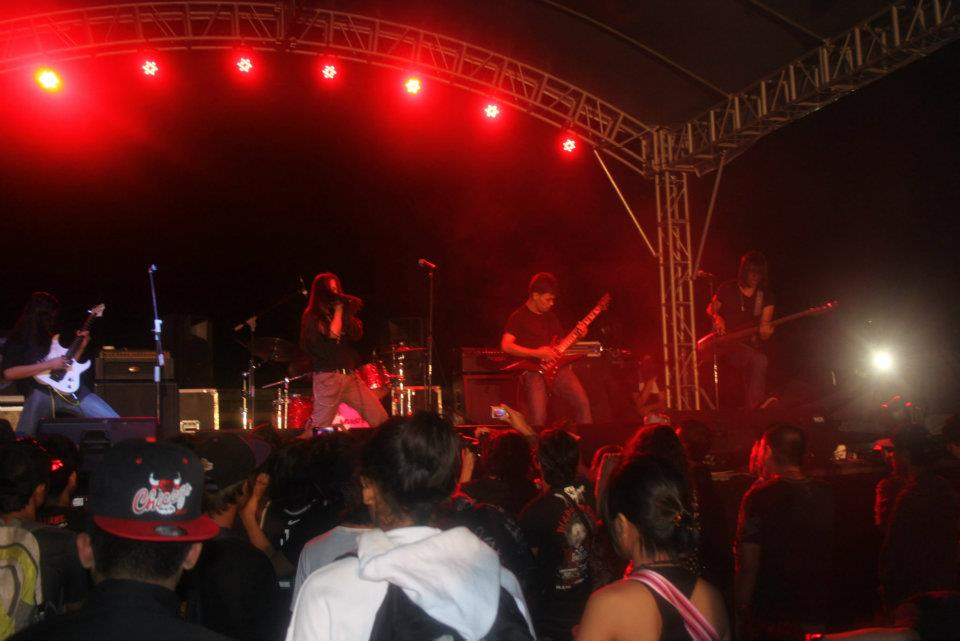
Voice Of Tranquility at Visual Music Carnival – Amoranto Stadium, Quezon City

In February 2009, the guitarist Carl Justine Morales reunited with the band years after he rejects the offer to be part of the first line-up. On the other hand, they also asked Miguel Fontiveros from a local metal group, to fill the bass section. The band released their first EP entitled "The Army of Hades", recorded at Earbender Studios in Kawit, Cavite. It was mixed and engineered by Macoy Manuel of SIN. The songs in the EP have been aired at RJ Underground Radio (105.9 FM) – a Local FM Radio Station in Metro Manila, Philippines, and in Online Radio Stations and Podcast Shows across the world like Metal Messiah Radio, Cebu Metal Online Radio of Cebu City, The World Metal Podcast of Guatemala and a lot more. The band had several radio interviews and guested in different stations and shows like RJ Underground Radio 105.9 FM, The Bel and Joey Show on Digradio (Former NU 107) and more. Since then, they played numerous shows, in and out of the metro like: Gods of Metal, Red Horse Beer-Rakista Rakrakan Series and Rakista Jam Tayo, Filipino Metal Magazine Launch Tour, Tower of Doom Event, Lamb of God – Wrath Album Listening Tour (Warner Music Philippines), Indiemand Events, to list a few.

=== Pulp Summer Slam 11 and Stig Awards (2011–2012) ===
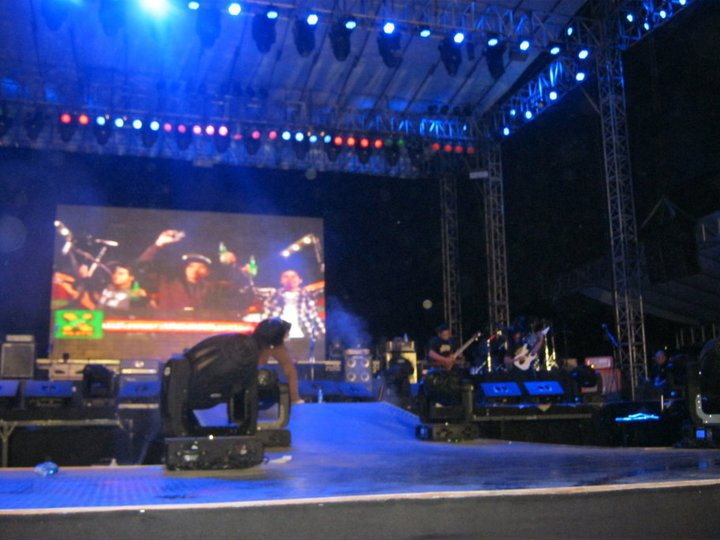
Voice Of Tranquility at Pulp Summer Slam – Amoranto Stadium, Quezon City

In February 2011, they added Janjan Molina of the band Goredemise as their new guitarist, to fill in the rhythm section.

In that year also, the band was given a chance to be a part of the "25 Local Loudest Bands" that would play for the annual Pulp Summer Slam XI – Resurrection at Amoranto Stadium, in Quezon City (The Mecca of Rock in the Philippines), last April 30, 2011, featuring Anthrax, Death Angel, Hellyeah, and U.A.E's Finest Death Metal Band: Nervecell. The band was featured on Pulp Magazine's September 2011 Issue, and they also played at Skarlet Jazz Kitchen, Timog Avenue, Quezon City for Pulp Magazine / Pulp Live World's Arch Enemy – Khaos Legions Album Launch.

In 2012, they performed at Pulp Magazine / Pulp Live World's Megadeth's Pre-Concert Show in South Bar, Las Pinas. Around the month of November in the same year, their founder / drummer, Valentine, was nominated on 'Stig Awards (formerly known as Stagg Awards), which is organized by the biggest music retailer in the Philippines (The Music Source and Lyric).

=== The Army of Hades II – Re-issue (2013) ===
Voice Of Tranquility's second release is entitled The Army of Hades II which is a re-issue of their 2009 EP for International Distribution under Bhumidhuka Production – Malaysia, was released on January 12, 2013, in Philippines, January 16, 2013, in Malaysia (Worldwide Release), January 21, 2013, in Thailand and February 17, 2013, in Indonesia, as well in Germany and other parts of the globe for the celebration of their ninth anniversary. In that year also, the band was nominated for "Best Music-YouTube Category" at Globe Tatt Awards 2013.

=== 10 Years of Existence and Pulp Summer Slam 14 (Early 2014) ===
Voice of Tranquility celebrated their tenth anniversary gig in January 2014 and were chosen as one of the seven local acts that performed back on April 26, 2014, in PULP Summer Slam XIV: Children of the Damned, the biggest annual music festival in the country, at the Amoranto Stadium, Quezon City, Philippines. The mentioned festival was headlined by Asking Alexandria and Bullet For My Valentine with Kreator, Death Angel, The Black Dahlia Murder, Hatebreed and Crossfaith from Japan.

=== Downfall (2015 – Early 2017) ===
In July 2015, Voice of Tranquility's founder and longtime drummer Valentine Parco Caroche, left the band because of private reasons. In spite of that, he still pursued his passion for music and continued playing drums for other bands like Tevanny, Sanctus, and Mr. Bones and the Boneyard Circus, to list a few. On the other hand, the band continued to play live shows along with several session drummers.

=== The Legacy and Beyond (2017–2019) ===
In summer of 2017, after the hiatus for almost 2 years, their long time drummer, Valentine Parco Caroche finally reconvened with the band, they also played for the first time at Dutdutan Tattoo Convention in September 2017.

During the summer season of 2018, the band signed on their first major record deal with the Philippine-based recording company, Ivory Music and Video (Sony Music Philippines) / Enterphil Entertainment Corporation.

== Members ==
- Trish Cromwell– Vocals (2025-Present)
- Kei Deguchi – Bass (2019–Present)
- Val Caroche – Drums (2003-2015/2017–Present)
- Derick De Luna – Synths (2019–present)
- Jerico Rangas – Guitars (2019–present)

Former Members

- Babie Borja – Vocals (2018–2019/2022–2023)
- Alex Sabordo - Guitars (2022-2023)
- Deda Willet Dela Cruz – Vocals (2019–2022)
- Sammad Abubakkar – Bass (2005–2008) / Guitars (2019–2022)
- Arnie Jane "Rny" Ortega – Vocals (2003–2018)
- Phimart Pilande – Guitars (2003)
- Dexter Miranda – Bass (2003)
- Gabriel Mendoza – Bass (2005)
- Luther John Oplida – Guitars (2005–2008)
- Sammad Abubakkar – Bass - Deceased (2005–2008 and 2019-2021)
- Jhunlee Kim Oplida – Guitars (2006–2007)
- Raul Babor – Guitars (2008)
- Rex Aiur – Guitars (2009)
- Carl Justine Morales – Guitars (2009–2019)
- Janjan Molina – Guitars (2011–2019)
- Meg Fontiveros – Bass (2009–2019)

== Discography ==
Year	Title	Singles	Label
2007	A*** Sacrifice (Demo)	A*** Sacrifice	Independent
2009	The Army of Hades EP	Army of Hades	Independent
2013	The Army of Hades EP (Re-issue)	This is Our Revenge	Bhumidhuka Malaysia
2018		Shadowplay of the Sinistress	Ivory Music and Video
2018		Serpents Rise	Ivory Music and Video
2020		Wild Wild Wild	

== Singles, Compilations and Videography ==
Singles

- Enemy (2006)
- Army of Hades (2008)
- Warlord (2009)
- This is Our Revenge (2010)
- Shadowplay of the Sinistress (2018)
- Serpents Rise (2018)
- Wild Wild Wild (2020)

Songs

- Enemy
- Army of Hades
- Warlord
- Lazarus
- ...of how you lived and died
- Coma
- This is our Revenge
- Beheading
- Serpents Rise
- Shadowplay of the Sinistress
- Wild Wild Wild

Compilations

- Beasts of Modern Aggression 4 Way Split (2010)
- Death March Compilation (2010)
- East Jakarta Media – Total Bising Compilation – Jakarta, Indonesia (2013)
