= Ex Machina (album) =

Studio album by Crossfaith
- Released: 1 August 2018
- Genre: Electronicore; alternative metal; nu metal
- Length: 45:06
- Label: Sony Music
- Producer: Drew Fulk

Crossfaith chronology
Xeno (2015)	Ex Machina (2018)	Species (2020)

Singles from Ex Machina
- 1. "The Perfect Nightmare" Released: 7 June 2018; 2. "Catastrophe" Released: 10 July 2018; 3. "Wipeout" Released: 3 August 2018; 4. "Make a Move" Released: 11 September 2018

Ex Machina (stylised as EX_MACHINA) is the fourth studio album by Japanese metalcore band Crossfaith. It was released on 1 August 2018 in Japan through Sony Music, and later released on 3 August 2018 worldwide. It was produced by Drew Fulk. This was the final studio album with bassist Hiroki Ikegawa before his departure in 2021.

== Background and promotion ==
In an interview with Dead Press! in April 2017, the band confirmed that they had two new singles ready for release for the summer and that they planned to release the fourth studio album on 1 August 2018.

== Critical reception ==
Professional ratings
Review scores
Source	Rating
Already Heard	4/5 stars
Dead Press!	8/10
Distorted Sound	8/10
KillYourStereo	70/100
Rock 'N' Load	8/10
Wall of Sound	2/10

The album received mostly positive reviews, but also mixed reviews from several critics. Already Heard rated the album 4 out of 5 and stated: "There's much to unpack on Ex Machina and it's worthy of a few listens to delve deeper into the lyrical content to unravel the world they've created, and the commentary they're making about our own current society. A dramatic and epic heavy opus, this album will surely stand the test of time amongst the band's back catalogue." Dead Press! scored the album 8 out of 10 and said: "In fact, the standout moments on the record invariably occur on tracks like this where the band dare to blend all of their influences together in equal parts rather than distinctly favouring one over the other. In this respect, Crossfaith have really honed their compositional skills; the transitions between the heavy and harsh verses and the big dance choruses are smoother and more fluid then ever before. With Ex Machina, Crossfaith have effectively combined the punch and power of their critically acclaimed Zion EP era with the more expansive, chorus orientated songwriting of the more maligned Xeno." Distorted Sound scored the album 8 out of 10 and said: "On the whole, what EX_MACHINA essentially does is put forward a refined distillation of everything CROSSFAITH have accomplished up to date, rather than any kind of drastic reinvention. The band have clearly found their niche over the last few years, and this record serves as excellent proof of their continued songwriting brilliance and knack for finding and melding together both brutally heavy guitar work and screaming with the occasional anthemic chorus. Fans are sure to love it, and newcomers may well find themselves quickly assimilated into the CROSSFAITH machine."

Alex Sievers from KillYourStereo gave the album 70 out of 100 and said: "After sitting on the outskirts of Crossfaith's sound for years now, Ex_Machina has finally pushed me over the edge and down into their cyber-metal digital realm. Despite a couple duds that just don't match the seriousness or urgency of this record's excessively better takes, I'm honestly more than happy to have now been plugged right into Crossfaith's futuristic, synthetic world. Fingers crossed that future updates aren't riddled with any bugs." Rock 'N' Load praised the album saying, "All 13 songs that span the 46 minutes push the boundaries of blending genres to create something that can only be really be called Crossfaith. The complexity works and takes a few listens to appreciate the difficulties that have been overcome to make it become something that is undoubtably an impressive result." Wall of Sound gave the album a slightly negative score 2/10 and saying: "Overall, this album is a massive misfire from a band capable of far better. There is not even an inch of the greatness, we all know this band is capable of achieving. Riddled with cliches we've heard a million times before and sporting more ballads than an Ed Sheeran album. I strongly recommend checking out any of their earlier work before diving into the questionable content found on this release."

== Track listing ==
No.	Title	Length
1.	"Deus Ex Machina"	1:39
2.	"Catastrophe"	3:32
3.	"The Perfect Nightmare"	3:58
4.	"Destroy" (featuring Ho99o9)	3:37
5.	"Freedom" (featuring Rou Reynolds of Enter Shikari)	3:21
6.	"Make a Move"	3:20
7.	"Lost in You"	4:14
8.	"Wipeout"	3:56
9.	"Milestone"	4:39
10.	"Eden in the Rain"	3:18
11.	"Twin Shadows"	2:20
12.	"Daybreak"	4:27
13.	"Faint" (Linkin Park cover; featuring Masato Hayakawa of Coldrain)	2:45
Total length:		45:06

== Personnel ==
Crossfaith

- Kenta Koie – lead vocals
- Kazuki Takemura – guitars
- Terufumi Tamano – keyboards, programming, samples, backing vocals
- Hiroki Ikegawa – bass
- Tatsuya Amano – drums

Additional musicians

- Ho99o9 – guest vocals on track 4
- Rou Reynolds of Enter Shikari – guest vocals on track 5
- Masato Hayakawa of Coldrain – guest vocals on track 13

Additional personnel

- Drew Fulk – production

== Charts ==
Chart performance for Ex Machina
Chart (2018)	Peak position
Japanese Albums (Oricon)	16
UK Album Downloads (OCC)	99
