= Xeno (album) =

Studio album by Crossfaith
- Released: 16 September 2015
- Genre: Metalcore; electronicore; electronica; alternative metal
- Length: 43:36
- Label: UNFD; Ariola Japan; Razor & Tie
- Producer: Josh Wilbur

Crossfaith chronology
Apocalyze (2013)	Xeno (2015)	Ex Machina (2018)

Singles from Xeno
- 1. "Ghost in the Mirror" Released: 7 July 2015; 2. "Xeno" Released: 17 July 2015; 3. "Devil's Party" Released: 5 August 2015

Xeno is the third studio album by Japanese metalcore band Crossfaith. It was released on 16 September 2015 through Ariola Japan, Razor & Tie and UNFD. It was produced by Josh Wilbur.

== Critical reception ==
Professional ratings
Review scores
Source	Rating
AllMusic	4/5 stars
Already Heard	2/5 stars
Dead Press!	6/10
Distorted Sound	9/10
KillYourStereo	80/100
Louder Sound	4/5 stars
Rock Sins	9/10
Sputnikmusic	3/5 stars

The album received mostly positive reviews, but also mixed reviews from several critics. AllMusic gave the album a positive review saying, "On their fourth album of electronicore mayhem, Japan's Crossfaith shoot for the stars with a sci-fi concept about artificial intelligence, the conflicts within, and rebirth through destruction. Epic in its theatricality, Xeno begins with symphonic dread (not unlike Muse's "2nd Law" suite) before being punctuated with stabs of typical Crossfaith rave synths. The mosh-pit-in-space opens up on the title track, a biting metalcore track with orchestral and EDM flourishes. This combination of brutality and catchy beats has long been their m.o., but on Xeno they finally nail the balance with deft cohesion, leaving behind much of Apocalyze's Skrillex dubstep and the generic metalcore of their first two releases." Already Heard rated the album 2 out of 5 and stated: "For all their achievements in recent years, Xeno is a step backwards for Crossfaith. It's an album that is hindered by overtly slick production and simplistic songwriting. However Crossfaith have the ability to produce a frantic and compelling live show to fall back on. It's this saving grace that will help Crossfaith win fans over with some of Xeno poorest moments." Dead Press! scored the album 6 out of 10 and said: "Having said this, Xeno delivers more than enough trademark Crossfaith to keep fans sated, the title tracks rampaging thump and an typically outrageous (if cringe worthy) appearance from Skindred's Benji Webbe ('Wildfire') maintaining the glo stick/head banging vibes, yet it is difficult to swerve the feeling that the band have compromised something of themselves. The thrill of Crossfaith's emergence came from their refusal to curtail either side of their rave/rock blueprint. It is a shame that, just a few years down the line, the same cannot be said for Xeno."

Distorted Sound scored the album 9 out of 10 and said: "What becomes very clear upon listening to Xeno is that CROSSFAITH definitely know how to write pit-ready anthems. The likes of 'Ghost in the Mirror' and 'Raise Your Voice' display perfectly just how far the band have progressed since their debut, whilst the stadium-ready choruses of songs like 'Wildfire' hint at exactly where the band are aiming to go next. One thing is certain – for CROSSFAITH, the only way is up." Peyton Bernhardt from KillYourStereo gave the album 80 out of 100 and said: "This album is what we expected from Crossfaith, but that doesn't mean it's not every damn bit as enjoyable as what it would be if it wasn't. There are few bands who can wear electronic metalcore like Crossfaith do, and even fewer who can maintain their success in driving the genre, be it through their thematic genius or their experimental ingenuity. It sounds like an awkward concept: a metallic J-rocky offering that rides out waves of electronica in its playback. But it works, and if listening to Xeno doesn't convince you, we'll be damned." Louder Sound gave the album a positive review and stated: "Since the release of their first album in 2009, Crossfaith have only been getting better, and have absorbed countless influences along the way from metalcore to emo to house."

Sam Dignon of Rock Sins rated the album 9 out of 10 and said: "It's these bits of experimentation mixed with the more traditional Crossfaith songs during the first half which make Xeno Crossfaith's most interesting album yet. Combine this with the fact that every member of the band really seems to have upped their game this time and the end result is easily Crossfaith's best album yet."

== Track listing ==
Standard edition
No.	Title	Length
1.	"System X"	1:35
2.	"Xeno"	4:12
3.	"Raise Your Voice"	3:42
4.	"Devil's Party"	3:16
5.	"Ghost in the Mirror" (featuring Caleb Shomo of Beartooth)	3:33
6.	"Dystopia"	3:18
7.	"Wildfire" (featuring Benji Webbe of Skindred)	3:58
8.	"Tears Fall"	4:19
9.	"Paint It Black"	3:49
10.	"Vanguard"	3:26
11.	"Calm the Storm"	3:27
12.	"Astral Heaven"	5:01
Total length:		43:36

Deluxe Edition bonus tracks
No.	Title	Length
13.	"Madness"	3:34
14.	"Dance with the Enemy"	3:28
15.	"S.O.S."	3:39
Total length:		51:37

== Personnel ==
Crossfaith

- Kenta Koie – lead vocals
- Kazuki Takemura – guitars
- Terufumi Tamano – keyboards, programming, samples, backing vocals
- Hiroki Ikegawa – bass
- Tatsuya Amano – drums

Additional musicians

- Caleb Shomo of Beartooth – guest vocals on track 5
- Benji Webbe of Skindred – guest vocals on track 7

Additional personnel

- Josh Wilbur – production

== Charts ==
Chart performance for Xeno
Chart (2015)	Peak position
Australian Albums (ARIA)	82
Japanese Albums (Billboard)	12
Japanese Albums (Oricon)	14
UK Albums (OCC)	136
UK Rock & Metal Albums (OCC)	13
UK Independent Albums (OCC)	19
