= Ark (Crossfaith album) =

Studio album by Crossfaith
- Released: 26 June 2024
- Genres: Electronicore; metalcore; alternative metal; nu metal
- Length: 35:35
- Label: UNFD

Crossfaith chronology
Species (2020)	Ark (2024)

Singles from Ark
- 1. "Zero" Released: 15 February 2024; 2. "L.A.M.N." Released: 18 April 2024; 3. "God Speed" Released: 16 May 2024; 4. "Warriors" Released: 7 June 2024; 5. "My Own Salvation" Released: 27 June 2024

Professional ratings
Review scores
Source	Rating
Distorted Sound	7/10
Wall of Sound	8/10

Ark (stylized as AЯK) is the fifth and final studio album by Japanese metalcore band Crossfaith. It was released on 26 June 2024 in Japan. This was the final album with longtime bassist Hiroki Ikegawa, and the only one with guitarist Daiki Koide who was fired from the band in June 2025.

== Background and promotion ==
On 15 February 2024, Crossfaith released the first single "Zero" alongside an accompanying music video. It was announced that touring guitarist Daiki Koide officially joined the band as a full-time member. On 18 April, the band unveiled the second single "L.A.M.N" featuring Bobby Wolfgang, alongside the album's announcement.

On 15 May, the band released the third single "God Speed" featuring Wargasm, along with an accompanying music video. This was followed by the singles "Warriors", featuring SiM vocalist MAH, and "My Own Salvation".

== Track listing ==
Ark track listing
No.	Title	Length
1.	"The Final Call"	1:52
2.	"Zero"	3:07
3.	"My Own Salvation"	3:20
4.	"God Speed" (featuring Wargasm)	3:18
5.	"Warriors" (featuring MAH of SiM)	3:59
6.	"Headshot!"	3:14
7.	"DV;MM¥ SY5T3M..."	3:24
8.	"L.A.M.N" (featuring Bobby Wolfgang)	2:39
9.	"Night Waves"	3:28
10.	"Afterglow"	2:10
11.	"Canopus"	5:04
Total length:		35:35

== Personnel ==
Crossfaith

- Kenta Koie – lead vocals
- Kazuki Takemura – guitars
- Daiki Koide – guitars
- Terufumi Tamano – keyboards, programming, samples, backing vocals
- Hiroki Ikegawa – bass
- Tatsuya Amano – drums

Additional musicians

- Wargasm – guest vocals on track 4
- MAH of SiM – guest vocals on track 5
- Bobby Wolfgang – guest vocals on track 8

== Charts ==
Chart performance for Ark
Chart (2024)	Peak position
Japanese Albums (Oricon)	33
Japanese Rock Albums (Oricon)	4
Japanese Hot Albums (Billboard)	26
