= Apocalyze =

Studio album by Crossfaith
- Released: 4 September 2013
- Genre: Metalcore; electronicore; industrial metal
- Length: 44:08
- Label: Smaller Recordings; Search and Destroy Records; The End; Sony Music
- Producer: Yasuo Matsumoto; Kenya Yamamoto

Crossfaith chronology
The Dream, the Space (2011)	Apocalyze (2013)	Xeno (2015)

Singles from Apocalyze
- 1. "We Are the Future" Released: 10 July 2013; 2. "Countdown to Hell" Released: 4 December 2013

Apocalyze is the second studio album by Japanese metalcore band Crossfaith. It was released on 4 September 2013 through Smaller Recordings in Japan, Search and Destroy Records in Europe and The End Records worldwide. It was produced by Yasuo Matsumoto and Kenya Yamamoto.

== Background and promotion ==
The album was recorded at Machine Shop Studios in New York City in January 2013 and will be released mainly through The End Records and Sony Music. Prior to the release of the album, the band released three music videos: "We Are the Future", "Eclipse" and "The Evolution".

== Critical reception ==
Professional ratings
Aggregate scores
Source	Rating
Metacritic	67/100
Review scores
Source	Rating
Alternative Press	3/5 stars
Blabbermouth.net	8/10
Dead Press!	9/10
KillYourStereo	82/100
Revolver	2.5/5 stars
Rock Sins	9/10
Rock Sound	8/10
Sputnikmusic	3/5 stars

The album received positive reviews from critics. At Metacritic, which assigns a normalised rating out of 100 to reviews from mainstream critics, the album has an average score of 67 out of 100 based on 4 reviews, indicating "generally favorable reviews". Alternative Press rated the album 3 out of 5 and said: "While their contemporaries may opt for subtler synth lines and catchy riffs, Crossfaith use programming as intensely as metal technicality on Apocalyze. Programmer Tamano Terufumi breaks out dubstep tropes like low-end wobbles and drops, but don't expect glowing hula hoops over jumpkicks in a Crossfaith pit anytime soon. The electronics leave you feeling more like you're inside a violent arcade game than on a dance floor, clean vocals are scarce and the closest thing you get to a slow song is "Counting Stars"—an illusion created by dreamy female guest vocals. That energy makes it feel like there's too much going on, leading to songs blending structurally, downplaying hooks. But the chaotic nature of Apocalyze is what Crossfaith want to showcase, perhaps at the sacrifice of the broader audience they could reach." Blabbermouth.net gave the album a score 8/10 and saying: "While CROSSFAITH may take some listener acclimation with all of their tenacious electronic rakes, Apocalyze is nevertheless a creative and energetic album that grows strength with repeated listens. This album will excite metalcore freaks like it's the dawn of a new era. Like their contemporaries MUCC and DIR EN GREY, this band isn't afraid to dabble, tinker and stretch boundaries largely borrowed from the western sanction. While BORIS continues to reign over the Japanese metal scene in their own modest way, CROSSFAITH will appeal to a broader audience. For certain, expect to hear these guys jacking up a video game or two in the near future."

Dead Press! scored the album 9 out of 10 and said: "Apocalyze has undoubtedly raised the bar exceedingly high, and it wouldn't be unfair to view their position on the metalcore heap rather insurmountable. Seeing these songs come into their own in a live setting is a mouth watering prospect, although it would be wise for venues to re-enforce their foundations now before it's too late. 'We Are The Future' indeed." Scrussel from KillYourStereo gave the album 82 out of 100 and said: "Crossfaith's brand of metal fused with electronic elements is an effective mix, and one that isn't too overdone that is just becomes a mess. Apocalyze hits that perfect ratio, creating a hybrid of sound that may not be fresh or unique but is easily enjoyable. What sets this album apart from others in the genre are refreshing and innovative ideas and some killer riffs that will keep you coming back over and over." Sam Dignon of Rock Sins rated the album 9 out of 10 and said: "Having built up a reputation as one of the most exciting live bands around over the past year, Crossfaith have fast become one of the most talked about bands on the Metalcore scene. Dance and electronics have been a part of Metalcore for a while now but no one has been able to master it quite like Crossfaith. Whilst most bands tended to just throw in the odd electronic section in, Crossfaith completely balance the two elements out, making Apocalyze one of the most refreshing Metalcore albums in recent years."

== Track listing ==
No.	Title	Length
1.	"Prelude"	0:28
2.	"We Are the Future"	3:31
3.	"Hounds of the Apocalypse"	3:30
4.	"Eclipse"	3:40
5.	"The Evolution"	3:43
6.	"Scarlett"	3:52
7.	"Gala Hala (Burn Down the Floor)"	4:28
8.	"Countdown to Hell"	3:53
9.	"Deathwish"	3:59
10.	"Counting Stars"	4:31
11.	"Burning White"	3:58
12.	"Only the Wise Can Control Our Eyes"	3:37
Total length:		44:08

Deluxe Edition bonus tracks
No.	Title	Length
13.	"Not Alone"	3:47
14.	"Against the Wave"	4:01
15.	"Outbreak"	2:45
Total length:		53:49

== Personnel ==
Credits adapted from AllMusic.

Crossfaith

- Kenta Koie – lead vocals
- Kazuki Takemura – guitars
- Terufumi Tamano – keyboards, programming, samples, backing vocals
- Hiroki Ikegawa – bass
- Tatsuya Amano – drums

Additional musicians

- Bianca Roman – vocals
- Jane Park – strings

Additional personnel

- Yasuo Matsumoto – executive production
- Kenya Yamamoto – executive production
- Kimikazu Harada – supervision
- Zakk Cervini – engineering, editing
- Alberto de Ieaza – engineering, editing
- Andy Gomoll – assisting, editing
- Tom Smith – assisting
- Ondien Galsworth – lyric editing
- Mio Yamamoto – A&R
- Tom Barnes – photography

== Charts ==
Chart performance for Apocalyze
Charts (2013)	Peak position
Japanese Albums (Billboard)	22
Japanese Albums (Oricon)	19
UK Albums (OCC)	137
UK Rock & Metal Albums (OCC)	11
US Top Heatseekers Albums (Billboard)	13
US Top Hard Rock Albums (Billboard)	18
