= The Artificial Theory for the Dramatic Beauty =

EP by Crossfaith
- Released: 29 April 2009
- Genre: Metalcore; electronicore; industrial metal; melodic death metal
- Length: 25:20
- Label: Zestone Records; Gan-Shin

Crossfaith chronology
Blueprint of Reconstruction (2008)	The Artificial Theory for the Dramatic Beauty (2009)	The Dream, the Space (2011)

The Artificial Theory for the Dramatic Beauty is the debut EP by Japanese metalcore band Crossfaith. It was released on 29 April 2009 through Zestone Records and Gan-Shin.

== Track listing ==
All tracks are written by Kenta Koie, Kazuki Takemura, Terufumi Tamano, Tatsuya Amano, and Hiroki Ikegawa

No.	Title	Length
1.	"If You Want to Wake Up?" (instrumental)	2:00
2.	"Mirror"	4:05
3.	"Blue"	3:53
4.	"Fiction in Hope"	4:32
5.	"Interlude" (instrumental)	1:12
6.	"Voices"	3:39
7.	"K"	4:05
8.	"Chemicarium" (instrumental)	1:53
Total length:		25:20

== Personnel ==
Crossfaith

- Kenta Koie – lead vocals
- Kazuki Takemura – guitars
- Terufumi Tamano – keyboards, programming, samples, backing vocals
- Hiroki Ikegawa – bass
- Tatsuya Amano – drums
