= The Dream, the Space =

Studio album by Crossfaith
- Released: 20 April 2011
- Genre: Metalcore; electronicore; post-hardcore; industrial metal
- Length: 30:23
- Label: Zestone Records; Gan-Shin; Tragic Hero

Crossfaith chronology
The Artificial Theory for the Dramatic Beauty (2009)	The Dream, the Space (2011)	Apocalyze (2013)

The Dream, the Space is the debut studio album by Japanese metalcore band Crossfaith. It was released on 20 April 2011 through Zestone Records in Japan and Tragic Hero Records worldwide.

== Critical reception ==
Professional ratings
Review scores
Source	Rating
Rock Sound	8/10

The album received positive reviews from critics. Rock Sound gave it 8 out of 10 and said: "Blowing us away with their stunning The Artificial Theory for the Dramatic Beauty at the tail end of last year, Crossfaith basically promise more of the same on this here follow up. Imagine if Bullet for My Valentine were to do all their shopping in Cyberdog and the results wouldn't be too far removed from what Crossfaith are offering; a near-perfect synthesis of technology and metal that should win the hearts and minds of rockers and rivetheads alike. Like its predecessor, The Dream, the Space is far too short for its own good but this only leaves us wanting more."

== Track listing ==
No.	Title	Length
1.	"Technologia" (instrumental)	0:22
2.	"Chaos Attractor"	2:28
3.	"Stars Faded in Slow Motion"	4:36
4.	"Promise"	3:24
5.	"The Dream, the Space"	3:34
6.	"Snake Code (Caribbean Death Roulette)"	3:46
7.	"Demise and Kiss" (featuring Masato Hayakawa of Coldrain)	3:44
8.	"Panorama (Interlude)" (instrumental)	1:02
9.	"Crystal Echoes Back to Our Tragedy"	4:19
10.	"Nostalgia" (instrumental)	3:08
Total length:		30:23

Japan edition bonus track
No.	Title	Length
11.	"Omen" (The Prodigy cover)	3:59

== Personnel ==
Crossfaith

- Kenta Koie – lead vocals
- Kazuki Takemura – guitars
- Terufumi Tamano – keyboards, programming, samples, backing vocals
- Hiroki Ikegawa – bass
- Tatsuya Amano – drums

Additional musicians

- Masato Hayakawa of Coldrain – guest vocals on track 7
