= Crossfaith =

Japanese metalcore band

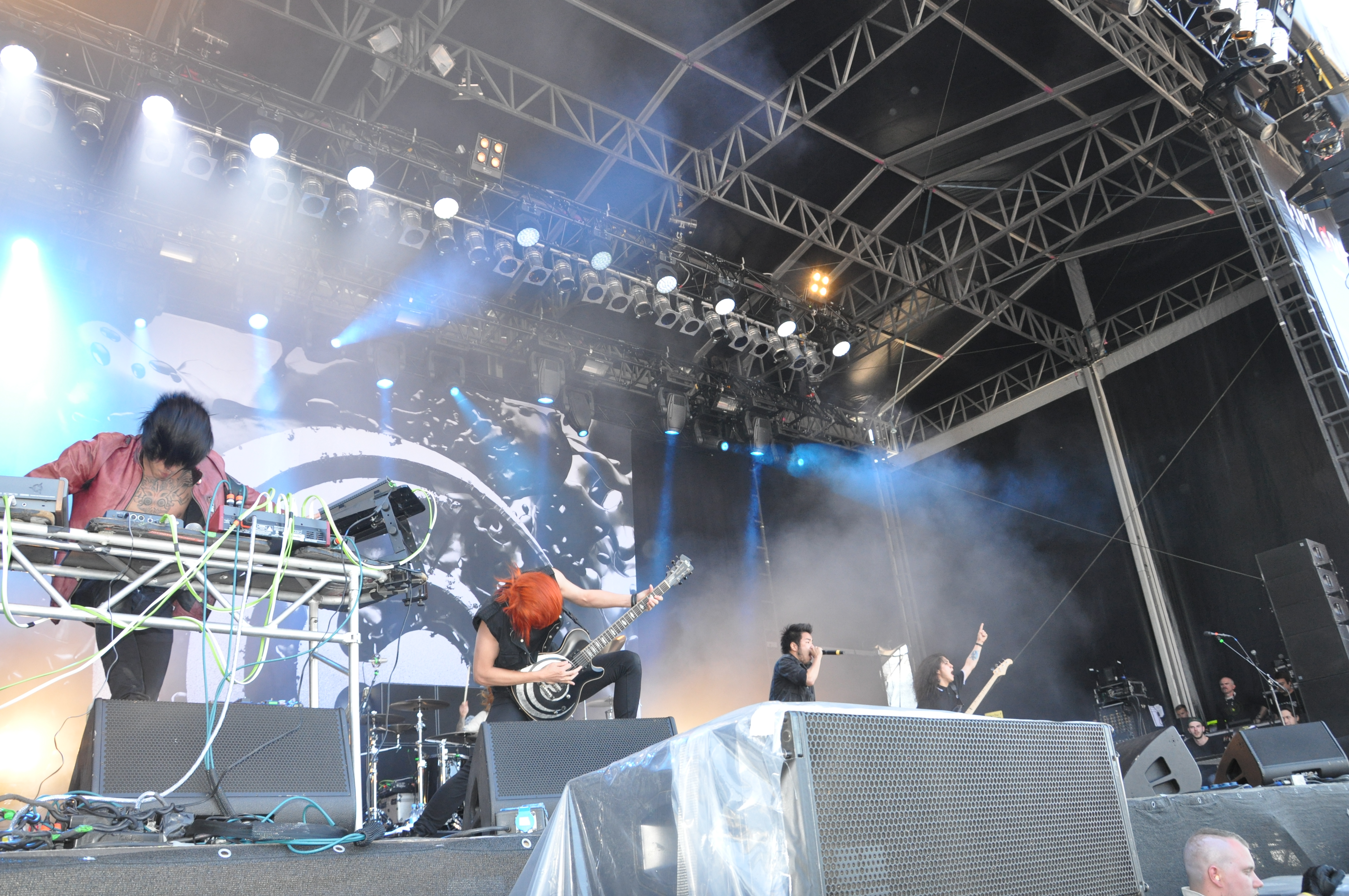
- Crossfaith performing at Rock am Ring in 2014

Background information
- Origin: Osaka, Japan
- Genres: Metalcore; electronicore
- Years active: 2006–2025 (hiatus)
- Labels: Razor & Tie; Sony Music; Search and Destroy; Tragic Hero; Zestone; Ariola Japan; UNFD
- Members: Kenta Koie; Kazuki Takemura; Terufumi Tamano; Tatsuya Amano
- Past members: Hiroki Ikegawa; Daiki Koide
- Website: www.crossfaith.jp

Crossfaith (Japanese: クロスフェイス) is a Japanese metalcore band from Osaka that was formed in 2006, which last consisted of vocalist Kenta Koie, guitarist Kazuki Takemura, drummer Tatsuya Amano, and keyboardist Terufumi Tamano. They are characterized by performing a style of metalcore with dubstep and other forms of electronic music influences, and for their intense live performances.

Crossfaith released their first demo Blueprint of Reconstruction in 2008. The band later released their debut EP The Artificial Theory for the Dramatic Beauty, through Zestone Records in 2009, and debut full-length studio album The Dream, the Space in 2011 through Tragic Hero Records. Crossfaith then released their second EP Zion in September 2012; this acted as a promotional release to countries outside Japan. The band released their second studio album, Apocalyze in September 2013. They released their third studio album, Xeno in September 2015 and their third EP, New Age Warriors in July 2016. The band released their fourth EP Freedom in August 2017; fifth EP Wipeout in January 2018, both consisting of 3 songs with the title tracks of each being released on their fourth studio album Ex Machina in August 2018. They released their sixth EP Species in May 2020. The band then released their fifth studio album Ark in June 2024, with their hiatus in June 2025.

== History ==
=== Early years, The Artificial Theory for the Dramatic Beauty and The Dream, the Space (2006–2012) ===
The band started when vocalist Kenta Koie, now guitarist Kazuki Takemura and turntablist Terufumi Tamano were in a nu metal band which they covered Linkin Park and Limp Bizkit songs. This used to feature Kenta rapping as well as screaming. After their cover band broke up Kenta wanted to start up a new metal band. To do this, he asked drummer Tatsuya Amano, a fellow student at his school who was in Kenta's music club to audition. Amano's drum cover of Slipknot's "(sic)" impressed Kenta and the others so much they knew they wanted him a part of the band. Turntablist Terufumi joined the new project with an inspiration from electronic dance music groups such as Chemical Brothers and The Prodigy, Terufumi would work to connect his electronica inspirations with the heavy metal covers the band was doing at the time. The band formed fuelled by their hatred of Japan's enormous pop music culture.

In 2010, Koie was featured in Manafest's song "No Plan B" on Avalanche/No Plan B EP.

Also in 2010, the band covered the song "Omen" by The Prodigy which was featured as a bonus track on the Japanese version of Fearless Records' Punk Goes Pop Volume 03.

In their early touring history, they were supported by bands like Hatebreed, Machine Head, In This Moment, Bleeding Through, The Used, August Burns Red or Memphis May Fire. In March 2011, Tragic Hero Records signed Crossfaith for an American release of their debut album The Dream, the Space.

=== Zion, international success and Apocalyze (2012–2014) ===
In 2012, Crossfaith's tour schedule for Europe expanded, supporting Of Mice & Men with Bury Tomorrow and later in the year supporting While She Sleeps alongside Bleed from Within and Polar in September. In August the band went to Japan to play the Summer Sonic Festival, the largest festival in the country, where they played at 3 am to 10,000 people.

In September 2012, the band released their second extended play Zion, used as an introductory sampler designed to break into a bigger market. Zion was named after the human city in The Matrix film series. The extended play revived a popular response from mainstream critics such as Kerrang! and The Sydney Morning Herald. Three promotional videos spawned out of the promotion of the EP: music videos for "Monolith" and "Jägerbomb" and one typography style video for "Photosphere". On November 10, the band performed at the Warped Tour 2013 at the Alexandra Palace in London on the 'Kevin Says Stage'. Their performance at the festival garnered much attention for the band.

On February 4, 2013, the Zion EP was released in Europe by Search and Destroy Records, and just a few days after that the extended play was streamed online at SoundCloud. Crossfaith performed at the Australian 2013 Soundwave festival for all five dates in Brisbane, Sydney, Melbourne, Adelaide and Perth between February 23 and March 4. They have also announced Sidewaves shows before the festival dates with Periphery. Just two days after their appearance in Australia the band is started their March tour across the United States in support of Enter Shikari and Architects.

In May, the band supported Bring Me the Horizon's headline tour of the United Kingdom. After their tour with Bring Me the Horizon they performed two headline shows at the Barfly in London and the Sugarmill in Stoke supported by We Butter the Bread with Butter, but due to the success of the London show sold they upgraded the venue to the Camden Underworld. Their performances were praised as offering "constant energy" and how Amano Tatsuya's drum solos were "stunning". This show was at the Underworld just a year after their show there supporting Of Mice & Men. Across July and August, Crossfaith was touring at the festival Warped Tour 2013 in the United States and will perform at Reading and Leeds Festivals in the United Kingdom. Crossfaith had released their second studio album Apocalyze in Japan on September 4, 2013, and on September 9 in the United Kingdom. The album was recorded at Machine Shop Studios in New York City in January 2013 and will be released through Search and Destroy and Sony Music. Before the release of Apocalyze, the band released three music videos: "We Are the Future", "Eclipse" and "The Evolution".

=== Later albums, Ikegawa's departure, Koide's arrival, and hiatus (2014–present) ===
On October 8, 2014, the band released a three-track long single titled Madness. The tracklist consists of the three songs: "Madness", "Dance with the Enemy", and "S.O.S.". Crossfaith has also announced that they will be playing the entire Vans Warped Tour in 2015 for North America, as well as playing the SlamDunk Festival in the United Kingdom in the May 2015. Crossfaith released their third studio album Xeno on September 18, 2015.

On July 27, 2016, the band released another three-track long single titled New Age Warriors, featuring three new songs: "Rx Overdrive", which had an accompanying music video, "Kill 'Em All" and "Revolution".

In an interview with Dead Press! in April 2017, the band confirmed that they had two new singles ready for release for the summer and that they planned to release the fourth studio album titled Ex Machina, which was released on August 1, 2018.

On February 5, 2020, the band debuted their first single "Endorphin" exclusively on Daniel P. Carter's BBC Radio 1 Rock Show, the day before the release of the single worldwide. However, the EP wasn't announced until the release of the second single "Digital Parasite" on April 9, 2020. Following the EP, the band released a bunch of remixes of "Endorphin", including one from Spanish techno DJ and producer Regal.

On February 16, 2021, the band released a brand new single "Dead or Alive". On April 7, the band released another new single "RedZone". On July 19, 2022, the band announced on the social media that their longtime supporting guitarist Tama departed on good terms and was replaced by Daiki Koide, formerly from Her Name in Blood. On January 30, 2024, Crossfaith announced on social media that they decided to part ways with bassist Hiroki Ikegawa.

On February 15, 2024, Crossfaith released the first single "Zero" alongside an accompanying music video. An announcement that touring guitarist, Daiki Koide has officially joined the band as a full-time member. On April 18, the band unveiled the second single "L.A.M.N" featuring Bobby Wolfgang. At the same time, they announced their fifth studio album, Ark, which was released on June 26, 2024. On May 15, the band released the third single "God Speed" featuring Wargasm, along with an accompanying music video.

On June 28, 2025, Crossfaith announced that guitarist Daiki Koide had been dismissed from the band following confirmed reports of inappropriate communication with an underage fan. The announcement followed the cancellation of the remaining dates on their European tour. On June 30, the band released a detailed timeline of events, including messages between Daiki and the fan, as well as messages exchanged with Falling in Reverse frontman Ronnie Radke. They also issued a public apology and announced the indefinite suspension of all band activities.

== Musical style ==
Crossfaith have used clean singing as far back as their first album, on the song "K". It is the only song on that album which uses clean vocals. On The Dream, the Space, they used clean vocals on the songs "Omen" and "Demise and Kiss", did not use any clean vocals on the Zion EP, and did on their third album Apocalyze on the songs "Eclipse", "Scarlett", "Only the Wise Can Control Our Eyes", and "Counting Stars". After Apocalyze, on the song "Madness", the majority of the song used clean vocals. On their third studio album, Xeno, most of the songs on this offering feature clean vocals. Crossfaith have also incorporated spoken word passages and whispers into their songs. Many their tracks are fully screamed, as opposed to other songs, where they use clean vocals more, which is much more common in their newer output. They have typically been labelled as metalcore and electronicore, blending influences from heavy metal, electronica, hardcore, melodic death metal and industrial metal. The band's music is seen as a combination of metalcore instrumentation and vocals with keyboards and industrial synths. They have been described as "Slipknot tearing the Prodigy limb from limb", and have been seen as a fusion of "metal, dance beats, raging punk fury and an energy that's entirely Crossfaith's own". The band has always wanted to write English lyrics as they felt their music is quite westernised.

The band's EP Zion showcases their synthesiser dominated sound, particularly on "Monolith" showcasing "double-kick beats, rapid chugging riffs and atmospheric bursts". While the party anthem "Jägerbomb" is seen as "pure Pantera groove metal with an underlying dash of synth" and is credited as solidifying Crossfaith's reputation as a party band. The pace of the record slows with "Dialogue", a "techno-infused instrumental" interlude with a "slow, tense electronic beat".

For their second album, Apocalyze, the band wrote lyrics which dealt with different subject matters. "We Are the Future" is written about bands who don't wish to sound like anything else which exists. "Deathwish" is a fictional tale about a man who wishes to seek revenge on his girlfriend's killer and "Countdown to Hell" which is about being bullied when at school. "Only the Wise Can Control Our Eyes" confronts the Fukushima Nuclear Disaster and how the band believes the government is withholding information about the disaster from the public. When commenting on the reasons behind writing about the disaster, Kenta said: "When I started writing the lyrics for the new album I thought I have to write about it for other Japanese people, but not really about [the] politics, [more] about the nuclear thing."

== Band members ==
Current members

- Kenta Koie (小家 健太, Koie Kenta) – lead vocals (2006–present)
- Kazuki Takemura (武村 和樹, Takemura Kazuki) – guitar (2006–present)
- Terufumi Tamano (玉野 輝文, Tamano Terufumi) – keyboards, programming, sampler, backing vocals (2006–present), bass (2006–2008)
- Tatsuya Amano (天野 達也, Amano Tatsuya) – drums (2006–present)

Former members

- Hiroki Ikegawa (池川 寛希, Ikegawa Hiroki) – bass (2008–2024)
- Daiki Koide – guitar (2024–2025; touring musician 2022–2024)

Former touring musicians

- Tama – guitar (2014–2022)

Live at Groezrock 2013, Belgium

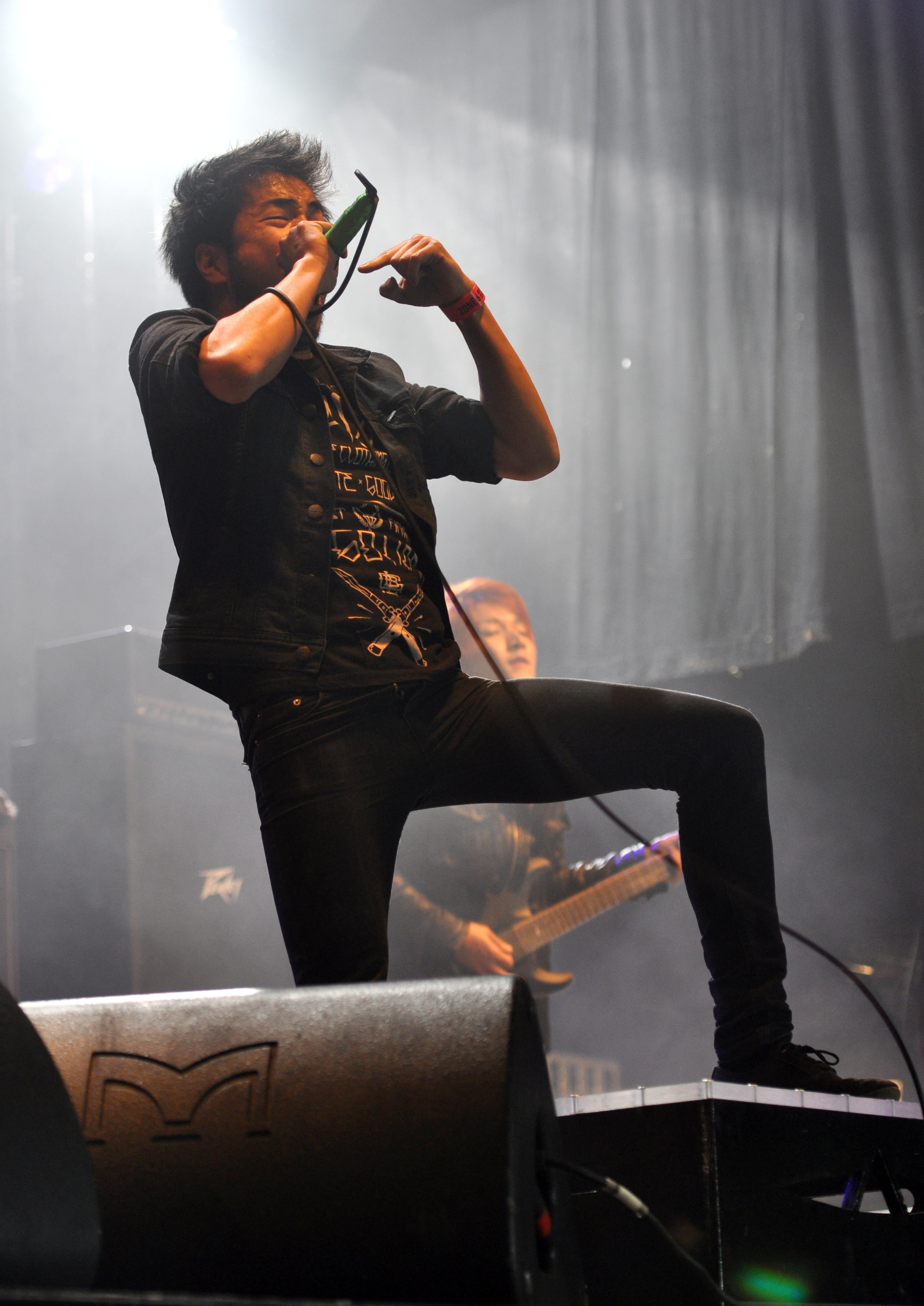
Kenta Koie

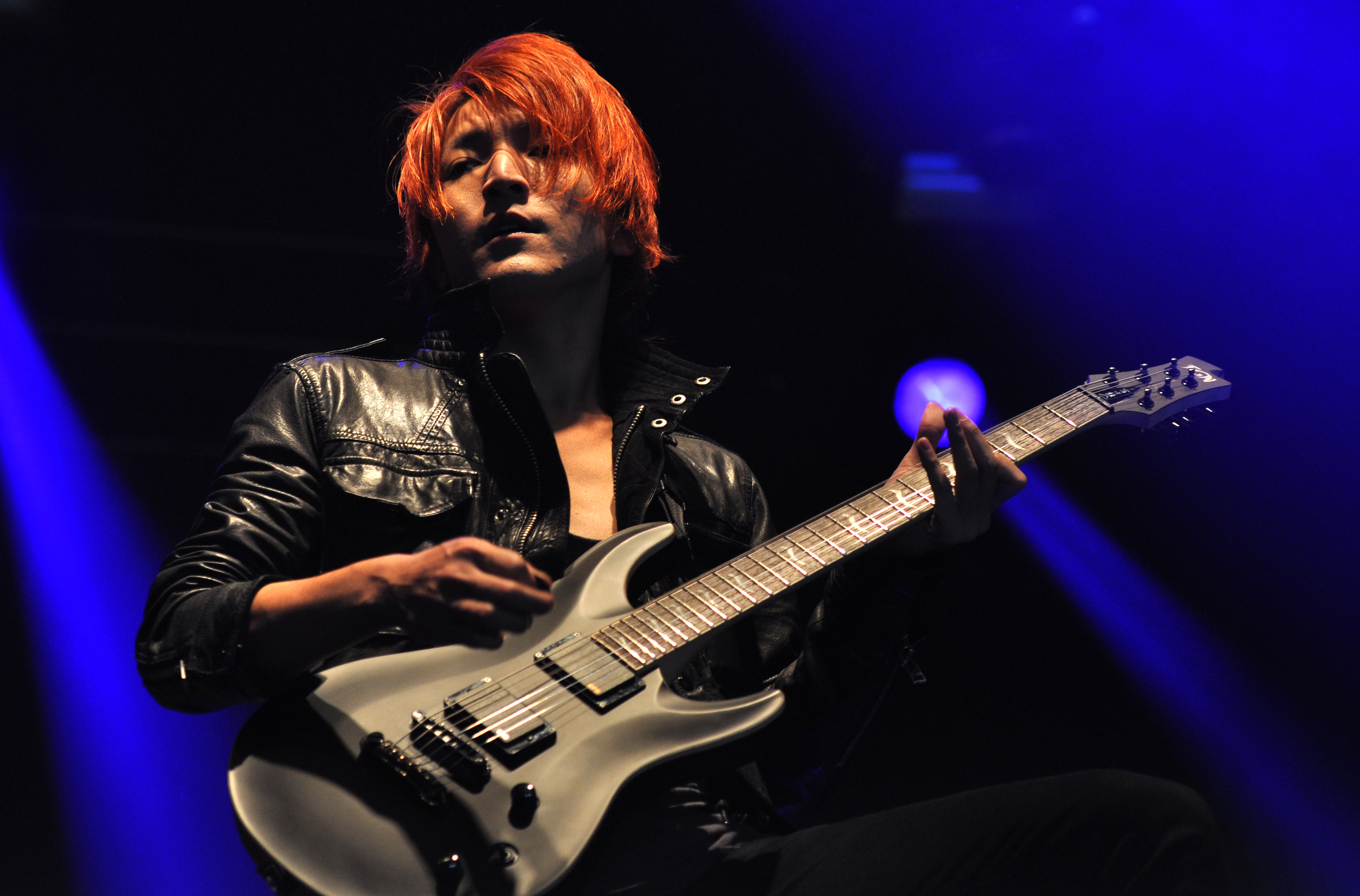
Kazuki Takemura

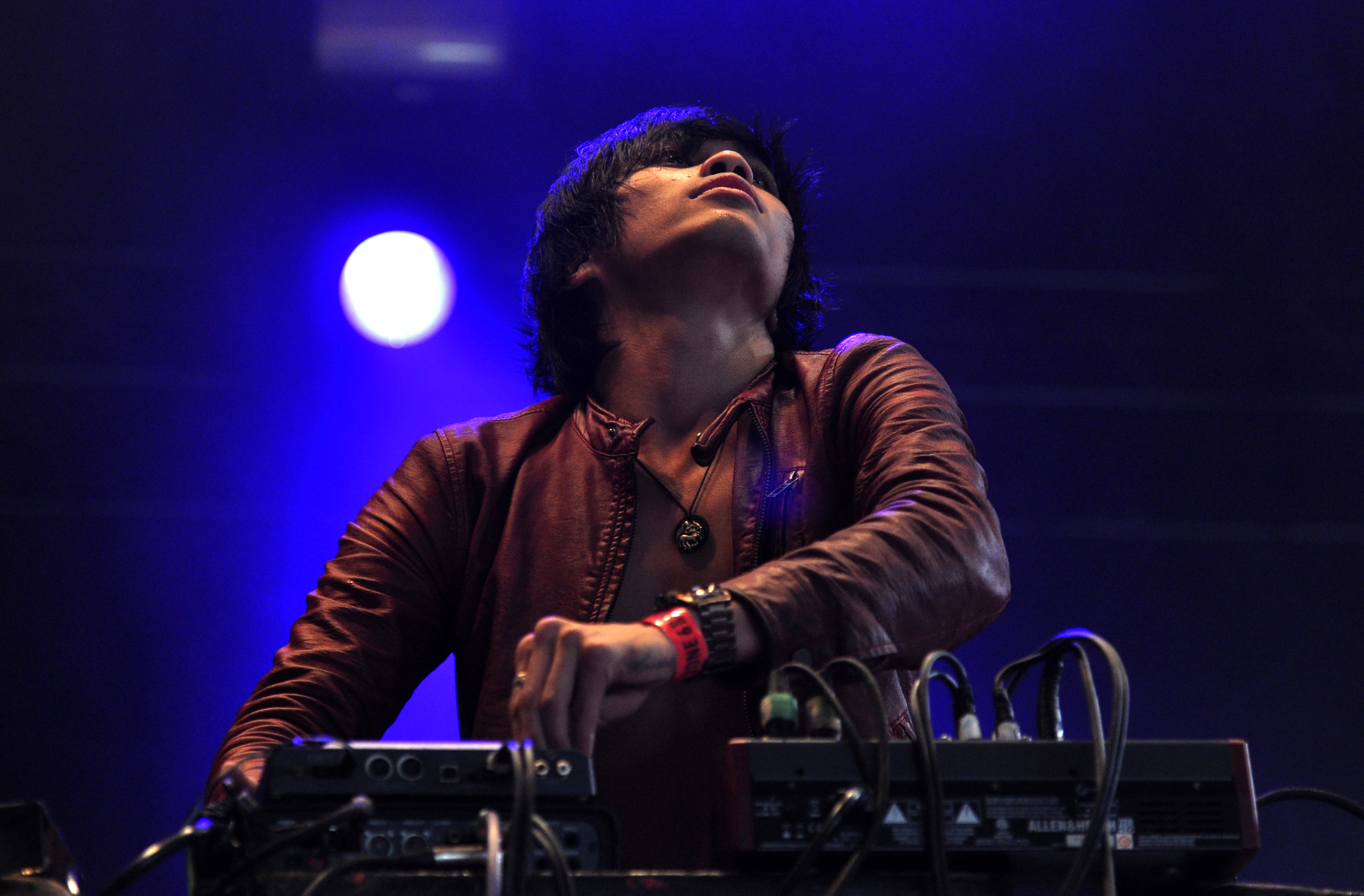
Terufumi Tamano

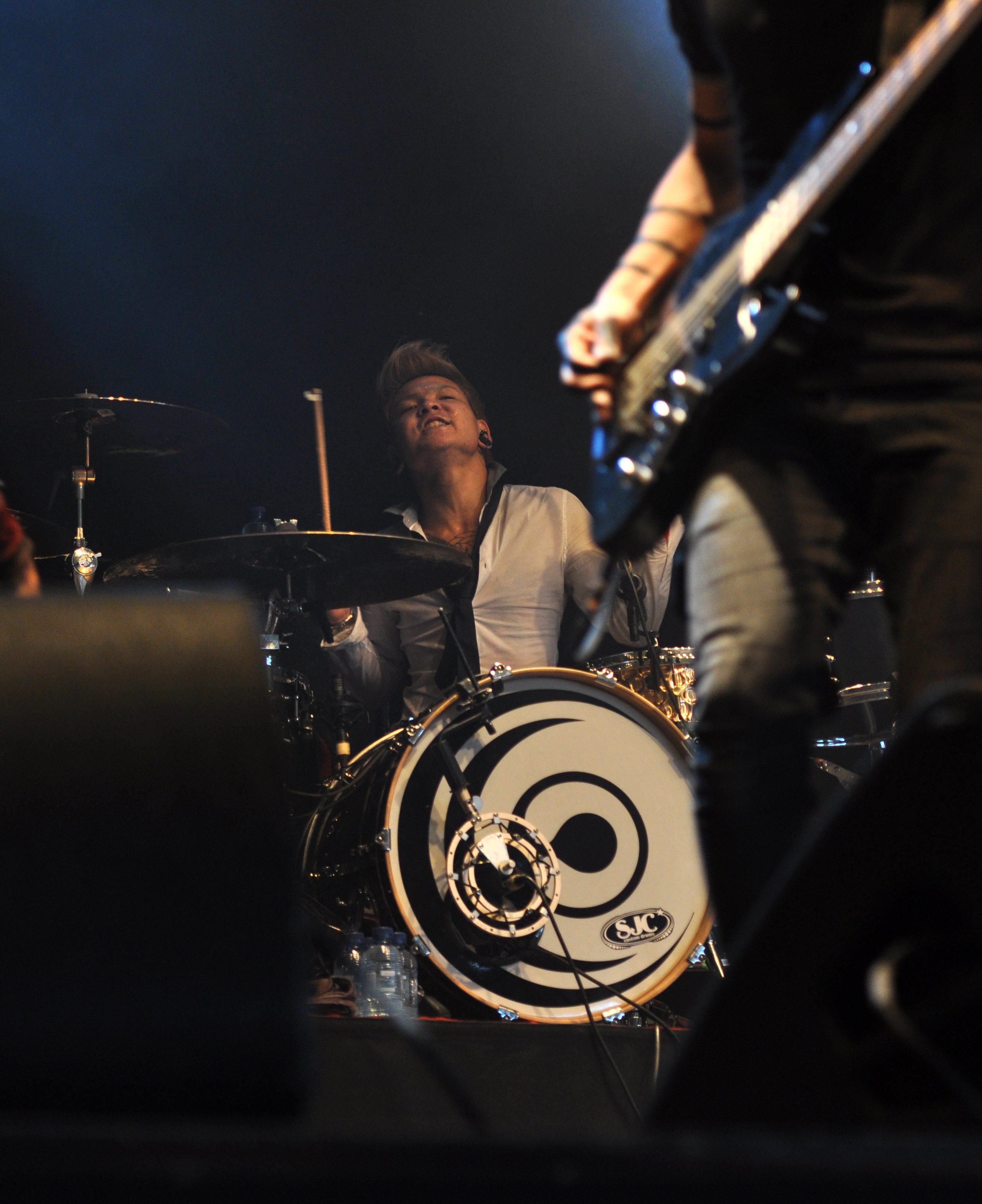
Tatsuya Amano

Timeline

== Discography ==
Studio albums

- The Dream, the Space (2011)
- Apocalyze (2013)
- Xeno (2015)
- Ex Machina (2018)
- Ark (2024)

== Awards and nominations ==
Metal Hammer Golden Gods Awards

Year	Nominee / work	Award	Result
2013	Crossfaith	Best New Band	Nominated
2014	Crossfaith	Best Breakthrough Band	Nominated

Kerrang! Awards

Year	Nominee / work	Award	Result
2014	Crossfaith	Best International Newcomer	Nominated

Alternative Press Music Awards

Year	Nominee / work	Award	Result
2014	Crossfaith	Best International Band	Nominated
2015	Crossfaith	Best International Band	Nominated

== Concert tours ==
=== Japanese tours ===
- Summer Sonic Festival with Various Artists (2011)
- Underoath Japan Tour with Crossfaith (2012)
- Ozzfest Japan with Various Artists (2013)
- Knotfest Japan with Various Artists (2014)
- Rock in Japan Festival with Various Artists (2014)
- Rising Sun Rock Festival with Various Artists (2014)
- Ozzfest Japan with Various Artists (2015)
- Knotfest Japan with Various Artists (2016)
- Knotfest Japan with Various Artists (2021)

=== World tours ===
- Of Mice & Men Tour in UK with Crossfaith and Bury Tomorrow (2012)
- While She Sleeps Tour in UK with Crossfaith, Bleed from Within, and Polar (2012)
- Vans Warped Tour in UK with Various Artists (2012)
- South by So What?! in USA with Various Artists (2012)
- Enter Shikari US Tour in US with Crossfaith, Architects, and Heartist (2013)
- Vans Warped Tour in US with Various Artists (2013)
- Reading and Leeds Festivals in England with Various Artists (2013)
- Soundwave Festival in Australia with Various Artists (2013)
- Bring Me the Horizon Australian Tour in Australia with Crossfaith and Of Mice & Men (2013)
- Reading and Leeds Festivals in England with Various Artists (2014)
- Rock am Ring and Rock im Park in Germany with Various Artists (2014)
- Beast Fest in Germany with Various Artists (2014)
- Download Festival in UK with Various Artists (2014)
- Hellfest in France with Various Artists (2014)
- Graspop Metal Meeting in Belgium with Various Artists (2014)
- Pulp Summer Slam in the Philippines with Various Artists (2014)
- Vans Warped Tour in US with Various Artists (2015)
- Slam Dunk Festival in UK with Various Artists (2015)
- Soundwave Festival in Australia with Various Artists (2015)
- Reading and Leeds Festivals in England with Various Artists (2016)
- Pulp Summer Slam in the Philippines with Various Artists (2017)
- Slam Dunk Festival in UK with Various Artists (2017)
