= Final Destination (album) =

2009 studio album by Coldrain

Studio album by Coldrain
- Released: 28 October 2009
- Recorded: July 2009
- Studios: Studio Sonorous Audio (Tokyo, Japan)
- Genres: Post-hardcore; punk rock; alternative rock
- Length: 43:20
- Label: VAP
- Producers: Masato Hayakawa; Ryo Yokochi

Coldrain chronology
8AM (2009)	Final Destination (2009)	Nothing Lasts Forever (2010)

Singles from Final Destination
- 1. "Fiction" Released: 5 November 2008; 2. "8AM" Released: 8 April 2009; 3. "Final Destination" Released: 23 October 2009

Coldrain chronology
15x(5+U) Live at Yokohama Arena (2023)	Final Destination (XV Re:Recorded) (2024)	Homecoming Live at Nippon Gaishi Hall (2025)

Final Destination (XV Re:Recorded)
- Artwork used for the fifteenth anniversary re-recorded album

Singles from Final Destination (XV Re:Recorded)
- 1. "Vengeance" Released: 11 February 2024

Final Destination is the debut studio album by Japanese rock band Coldrain. Recorded at Studio Sonorous Audio in Tokyo, Japan, it was self produced by Masato Hayakawa and Ryo Yokochi, and it was released on 28 October 2009, by VAP.

Final Destination was exclusively released in Japan, along with the second studio album follow-up The Enemy Inside, which was released in 2011. Final Destination debuted and peaked at number 88 on the Oricon Albums Chart, before dropping out of the charts completely the following week.

The album housed three singles, two of which were released as maxi-singles. "Fiction" in November 2008 and "8AM" in April 2009 respectively. The final single, "Final Destination", was released five days prior to the album's release.

In 2024, the band released a re-recorded version of Final Destination for the album's fifteenth anniversary, entitled Final Destination (XV Re:Recorded). Alongside the release, "Vengeance" was released in tandem as an additional track on the tracklist. It was initially released on 10 February 2024 as a venue-only limited CD sale at their homecoming show in Nagoya, but due to high fan demand, the band later released the re-recorded album worldwide on digital services after the conclusion of the album's fifteenth-anniversary tour on 26 May 2024 via Warner Music Japan. "Vengeance" was released as a single to promote the re-recorded album on 11 February 2024, as well as Adult Swim's anime Ninja Kamui to which it is the opening theme.

== Background ==
In the early 2000s, Masato Hayakawa and Katsuma Minatani met in high school in their hometown of Nagoya, Japan. They quickly became friends and due to their mutual love for heavy music, joined a band called Script of Creation together, before they quickly disbanded. Hayakawa and Minatani then started their own band called AVER with Hayakawa as the vocalist and guitarist, while Minatani was the drummer. They created a buzz around the local music scene, playing in clubs, before crossing paths with another band called Wheel of Life which had Ryo Shimizu as the vocalist, with Ryo Yokochi and Kazuya Sugiyama as the guitarists. They rivalled for a while before the two bands bonded after hearing Sevendust at one of the rehearsals they both attended. Due to their similar influences, both bands disbanded and formed a local supergroup on 17 April 2007. They decided to name the band Coldrain with Hayakawa as the lead vocalist, Yokochi, Sugiyama and Shimizu as the lead guitarist, rhythm guitarist and bassist respectively, with Minatani as the drummer. In an interview on Vans Warped Tour in 2016, Hayakawa stated they wanted to name the band something associated with their favourite colour, which was blue. In an earlier interview with Scuzz at Download Festival, Hayakawa joked that they wanted their CD's to be billed next to Coldplay in stores which also partially inspired their name.

The band quickly gained a cult following in their hometown by playing gigs in clubs and high school gyms, handing out CD demos after every performance. The first material the band ever recorded and released in 2007 was titled 1st, which included the first songs they ever recorded together such as "Painting" and "My Addiction". The band's second demo, released on 11 January 2008, was eponymously titled Coldrain, featuring early demos of "Fiction" and "Come Awake". It also included a song called "Been So Long", which has never been ever released outside of the demo, making it the rarest song in the band's entire discography.

== Composition ==
=== Styles and influences ===
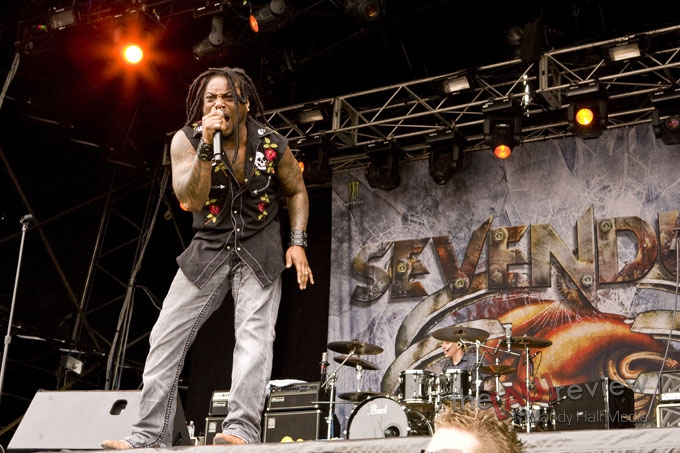
American rock band Sevendust have been credited as the band's biggest reason for forming, as well as being a huge early influence and inspiration on the album's sound.

Final Destination has been stylistically described by critics as post-hardcore, punk rock, and alternative rock. The album featured the two remastered singles "Fiction" and "8AM", while the album also featured demos of songs that were never previously released, such as "Painting", which was the first song the band had ever recorded and wrote together. Frontman Masato Hayakawa stated in an interview with Gekirock that the recording process in the studio during July 2009 that they never "felt bored", to which their lead guitarist Ryo Yokochi added that they wanted the record to sound natural. The band recorded the album on a tight schedule that added "tension" to the recording process, that Yokochi felt greatly impacted the album positively. The band were inspired by various different sounds such as emo, screamo and heavy metal, while also looking at bands like Taking Back Sunday, Sevendust and Dark New Day as other sources of inspiration. Hayakawa commented that the band wanted to mix pop and loud aggressive music together to form the band's core sound. Muraoka of Gekirock compared the songs on the album to the likes of Hoobastank and Lostprophets, to which they would further liken the sound of Final Destination to a samurai sword.

=== Lyrics and themes ===
The album's title track, "Final Destination" is about "a heroic determination to move forward with a life from which there is no turning back" and has been described as a "wonderful rock song with a catchy melody", that ended up becoming a fan favourite live staple for the band. "Counterfeits and Lies" tackles themes of the evils of television, "Fiction" and "24-7" are about "two-faced" friends, while "Someday" is about the life of working a dayjob. Final Destination also tackles themes of love, survival instincts and the art of life. The album's name was titled after the band's ambition for the record being a personal goal and a starting point in the band's journey.

== Promotion ==
=== Tour ===
Final Destination Tour
- Nationwide tour by Coldrain
- Location: Japan
- Start date: 13 November 2009
- End date: 27 December 2009
- Legs: 1
- No. of shows: 18
- Supporting acts: SiM; Last Alliance; Stance Punks; Pay Money to My Pain

Coldrain concert chronology
- 8AM Tour (2009); Final Destination Tour (2009); Nothing Lasts Forever Tour (2010)

In 2008, the band signed with the label VAP and embarked on their first nationwide tour, playing their first-ever concert outside of their hometown in Tokyo on 13 April. The band later opened for Story of the Year and As I Lay Dying as part of the first Japanese Taste of Chaos tour. Upon the release of the album's second single "8AM", the band extensively booked dates in clubs across the country in the Spring of 2009 to promote the single. On 7 August 2009, the band played at Summer Sonic in Osaka, which was headlined by Beyonce, Limp Bizkit and The Flaming Lips. Alongside playing at the festival, the band officially announced their debut studio album Final Destination which was released on 28 October 2009. In September 2009, the band officially announced their headline nationwide tour supporting their then upcoming debut studio album spanning eighteen dates across sixteen prefectures; kicking off in Hamamatsu, Shizuoka on 13 November and penultimately concluded on 27 December in their hometown of Nagoya. The tour was supported by a heavy variety of local rock bands such as SiM, Last Alliance, Stance Punks, and Pay Money to My Pain, as well as many others.

==== Set list ====
The following set list was obtained from the final concert held at Club Upset in Nagoya, Aichi on 27 December 2009. It is not intended to represent all concerts for the duration of the tour.

1. "Final Destination"
2. "Counterfeits & Lies"
3. "Someday"
4. "Just Tonight
5. "24-7"
6. "Time to Go"
7. "Déjà vu"
8. "Believe"
9. "Painting"
10. "8AM"
11. "Doors"
12. "Survive"
  Encore
13. "My Addiction"
14. "Fiction"

==== Tour dates ====
Final Destination Tour

Date	City	Prefecture	Venue	Opening act(s)
Japan
13 November 2009	Hamamatsu	Shizuoka	Mescalin Drive	Runners-Hi, Kidd, The Maddies [OA] Growth
16 November 2009	Kumagaya	Saitama	Heaven's Rock Kumagaya VJ-1	Last Alliance, Pay Money to My Pain, Egg Brain
17 November 2009	Mito	Ibaraki	Light House	B.F.A, Egg Brain, Meaning, Stack44
18 November 2009	Sendai	Miyagi	Macana	Stance Punks, Egg Brains, Novelty, The Sprocket
27 November 2009	Ōtsu	Shiga	B-Flat	My Summer Plan, Pop Disaster, Runners-Hi, Ska Freaks
30 November 2009	Kyoto City	Kyoto	Kyoto Muse	Musician's High, Runners-Hi, Scrap and Build, Vibedred
3 December 2009	Nagano	Nagano	Live House J	SiM, 3A-Material, Allround, Defthline
4 December 2009	Niigata	Niigata	Club Junk Box Mini	Pay Money to My Pain, SiM, A Crowd of Rebellion, Vibedred
5 December 2009	Fukui	Fukui	Chop	Pay Money to My Pain, SiM, Green Bowl, Smash Up, Stack44
6 December 2009	Kanazawa	Ishikawa	Vanvanv4	SiM, The Bonustrack, Sec Dimension, Uplift Spice
11 December 2009	Fukuoka	Fukuoka	Livehouse CB	Pan, Pinkloop
12 December 2009	Nagasaki City	Nagasaki	Studio Do!	Pan, Pinkloop
13 December 2009	Kitakyushu	Fukuoka	Wow!	Herish, Nostalgia Seven, Pan , Pinkloop, Yusuri
15 December 2009	Kumamoto	Kumamoto	Drum Be-9	Glory Hill, Fat Prop, Smash Raid
16 December 2009	Miyazaki	Shizuoka	SR-Box	Glory Hill, Fat Prop, Smash Raid
18 December 2009	Osaka	Osaka	Drop	Supe
22 December 2009	Tokyo	Greater Tokyo Area	Astro Hall	—N/a
27 December 2009	Nagoya	Aichi	Club Upset	—N/a

=== Singles ===
==== "Fiction" ====
After being initially being released on the band's eponymously titled second demo Coldrain, "Fiction" was re-recorded in August 2008 at Studio Sonorous Audio in Tokyo, Japan and was eventually released as their debut single on 5 November 2008, after previously signing to VAP earlier in the year. It was released as a CD maxi-single, acting as the lead single from the band's debut studio album Final Destination. Alongside the release, "Fiction" was accompanied by two B-sides "Come Awake" and "I Know", the latter still is the longest song in the band's entire discography to date. Upon release, it peaked at 181 on the Oricon Singles Chart for a solitary week. To promote the release of the lead single "Fiction", the music video was premiered on Space Shower TV on 29 October. The music video was later published to YouTube on 18 June 2010; as of October 2025, the music video for "Fiction" has over 570k views on YouTube.

==== "8AM" ====
The album's second single "8AM" was released as a CD maxi-single on 8 April 2009. On the maxi-single, "8AM" was accompanied by three B-sides, "Time to Go", "Believe" and an unplugged acoustic version of the lead single "Fiction". Unlike the lead single, "8AM" featured a DVD for those who bought the CD, which includes the music video for "8AM" and live video performances of "Painting", "Come Awake" and "Fiction" from various tour dates. It peaked on the Oricon Singles Chart at number 111. Starting from 6 January 2009, "8AM" was featured as the ending theme song for Season 2 of the anime Hajime no Ippo: New Challenger up till its season finale on 30 June. The music video for the song was filmed at the Nakatajima Sand Dunes on the outskirts of Hamamatsu, Japan. The music video was eventually published to YouTube on 18 June 2010; as of October 2025, the music video for "8AM" has over 1 million views on YouTube.

==== "Final Destination" ====
While not being released physically, the band released the title track "Final Destination" digitally alongside its music video on 23 October 2009 as the album's third and final single. The music video has since been published twice on YouTube by Gil Soundworks, once on the day of the single's release and on 15 June 2010. As of October 2025, the music videos for "Final Destination" has a cumulative total of over 2.8 million views on YouTube. Since its release, it has frequently been regarded as one of the best songs by the band and is a staple song on their setlist. The song has also since been released as a promotional live video for the band's fourth live album Live & Backstage at Blare Fest. 2020 on 19 October 2020.

== Track listing ==
All lyrics are written by Masato Hayakawa; all music is composed by Masato Hayakawa and Ryo Yokochi, except where noted

Final Destination track listing
No.	Title	Writer(s)	Length
1.	"Final Destination"		3:23
2.	"Counterfeits & Lies"	Masato Hayakawa; Ryo Yokochi; Kazuya Sugiyama	3:33
3.	"Someday"	Hayakawa; Yokochi; Sugiyama	3:59
4.	"Fiction" (Album version)		3:29
5.	"Just Tonight"		3:20
6.	"24-7"	Hayakawa; Sugiyama	3:03
7.	"Doors"		3:25
8.	"Déjà Vu"	Hayakawa; Sugiyama	4:17
9.	"Survive"	Hayakawa; Sugiyama	3:32
10.	"My Addiction"		4:19
11.	"Painting"		3:33
12.	"8AM" (Album version)		3:27
Total length:			43:20

Final Destination (XV Re:Recorded) track listing
No.	Title	Length
1.	"Final Destination - XV Re:Recorded"	3:22
2.	"Counterfeits & Lies - XV Re:Recorded"	3:33
3.	"Someday - XV Re:Recorded"	3:57
4.	"Fiction - XV Re:Recorded"	3:25
5.	"Just Tonight - XV Re:Recorded"	3:17
6.	"24-7 - XV Re:Recorded"	3:03
7.	"Doors - XV Re:Recorded"	3:19
8.	"Déjà Vu - XV Re:Recorded"	4:18
9.	"Survive - XV Re:Recorded"	3:30
10.	"My Addiction - XV Re:Recorded"	4:16
11.	"Painting - XV Re:Recorded"	3:31
12.	"8AM - XV Re:Recorded"	3:19
13.	"Vengeance"	3:58
Total length:		46:54

== Personnel ==
Credits retrieved from the album's liner notes.

Coldrain

- Masato David Hayakawa (マサト, Masato) – lead vocals, lyricist, producer
- Ryo Yokochi (ヨコチ, Y.K.C.) – lead guitar, programming, keyboards, producer, composer
- Kazuya Sugiyama (スギ, Sugi) – rhythm guitar, backing vocals
- Ryo Shimizu (リョウ, RxYxO) – bass guitar, backing vocals
- Katsuma Minatani (カツマ, Katsuma) – drums, percussion

Additional personnel

- Koichi Hara – recording engineer, mixing
- Hokuto Fukami – assistant engineer
- Hiromichi Takiguchi – mastering (Parasight Mastering, Tokyo)

Additional personnel (Final Destination (XV Re:Recorded))

- Sam Guaiana – mixing
- Mike Kalajian – mastering (Rogue Planet Mastering, Gardiner, New York, US)

== Charts ==
=== Original album ===
Chart (2009)	Peak position
Japanese Albums (Oricon)	88
Japanese Albums (Billboard)	73

=== Final Destination XV ===
Chart performance for Final Destination (XV Re:Recorded)
Chart (2024)	Peak position
Japanese Download Albums (Billboard)	74

== Release history ==
=== Original album ===
Release history and formats for Final Destination
Region	Date	Format	Label	Ref.
Japan	28 October 2009	CD; digital download	VAP	
Europe	11 November 2009	Digital download	VAP	
North America	11 November 2009	Digital download	VAP	

=== Final Destination XV ===
Release history and formats for Final Destination XV (Re:Recorded)
Region	Date	Format	Label	Ref.
Japan	10 February 2024	CD	Warner Music Japan	
Worldwide	26 May 2024	Digital download; streaming	Warner Music Japan	
