= American literature (disambiguation) =

American literature is the literature written or produced in the area of the US and its preceding colonies.

American literature may also refer to:

- American Literature (journal) (established 1929), a literary journal
- Inter-American literature, the comparative study of authors and texts from all the Americas
- American literature (academic discipline), an academic discipline devoted to the study of American literature

== See also ==
- Works related to Category:American literature at Wikisource
- Category:American literature
- American Fiction (disambiguation)
