= Hamamatsu Kite Festival =

Japanese city celebration

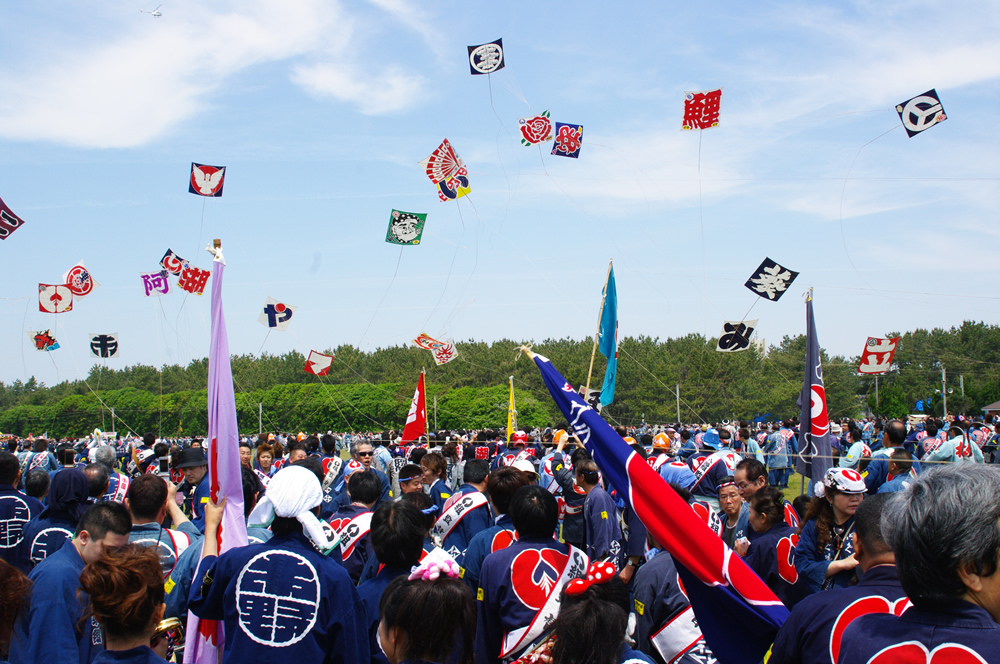
Tako

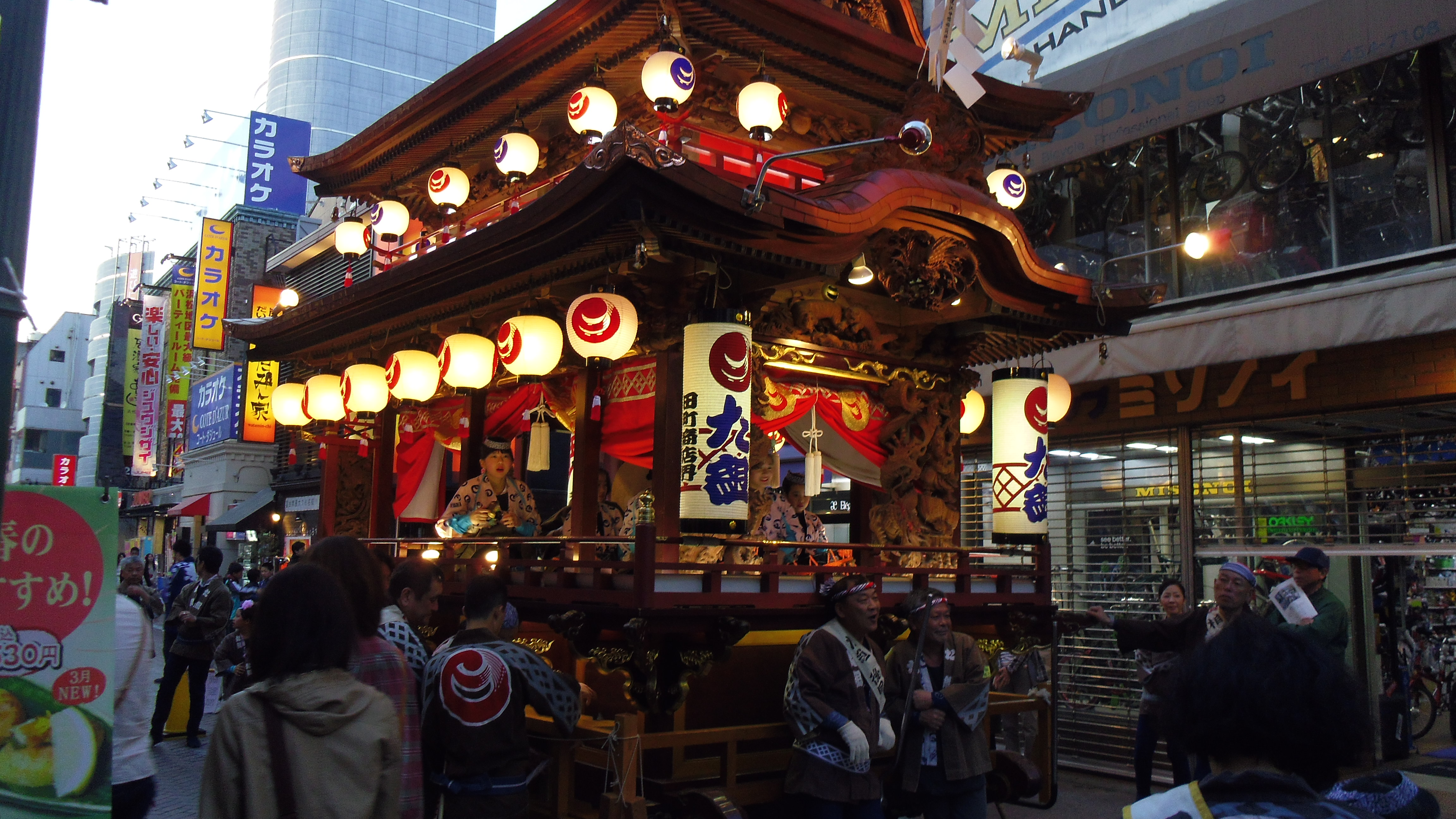
Yatai

Hamamatsu Kite Festival (浜松まつり) is a Japanese festival in Hamamatsu. It is generally known to have multiple kites, along with a lot of kite battles through the days it is held. The festival also displays examples of Japanese culture through food, and general items available for purchase in merchant booths at the festival. The Hamamatsu Festival is held every year on May 3-5 in Hamamatsu City, Shizuoka Prefecture. This is citizen festival. Also, this is one of the largest festivals in Japan, attracting approximately 2 million visitors each year. During the festival, spectacular kite-flying battles take place on the Nakatajima sand dunes, and at night the festival moves into the downtown area, where floats parade through the city. It is said that this kite flying festival began more than 460 years ago when the Lord of Hikuma Castle, who ruled Hamamatsu and the surrounding area. He flew a kite to celebrate the birth of his first son. However, there is little literary evidence to support this legend. The climate in this area is suitable for kite flying because of the strong and wild winds known as the "Enshu Karakaze”. The climate is suitable for kite flying. Therefore, the custom of flying kites is to celebrate the birth of a child. This tradition is deeply rooted in the region.

== Details ==
- Tako (Kite battle）
- Yatai
- Neri

Participants say "Oisho, oisho!"

In Hamamatsu, the first son's birth celebration is Hatsuiwai(初祝い).

This festival is held three days from 3 to 5 May every year.

=== Tako ===
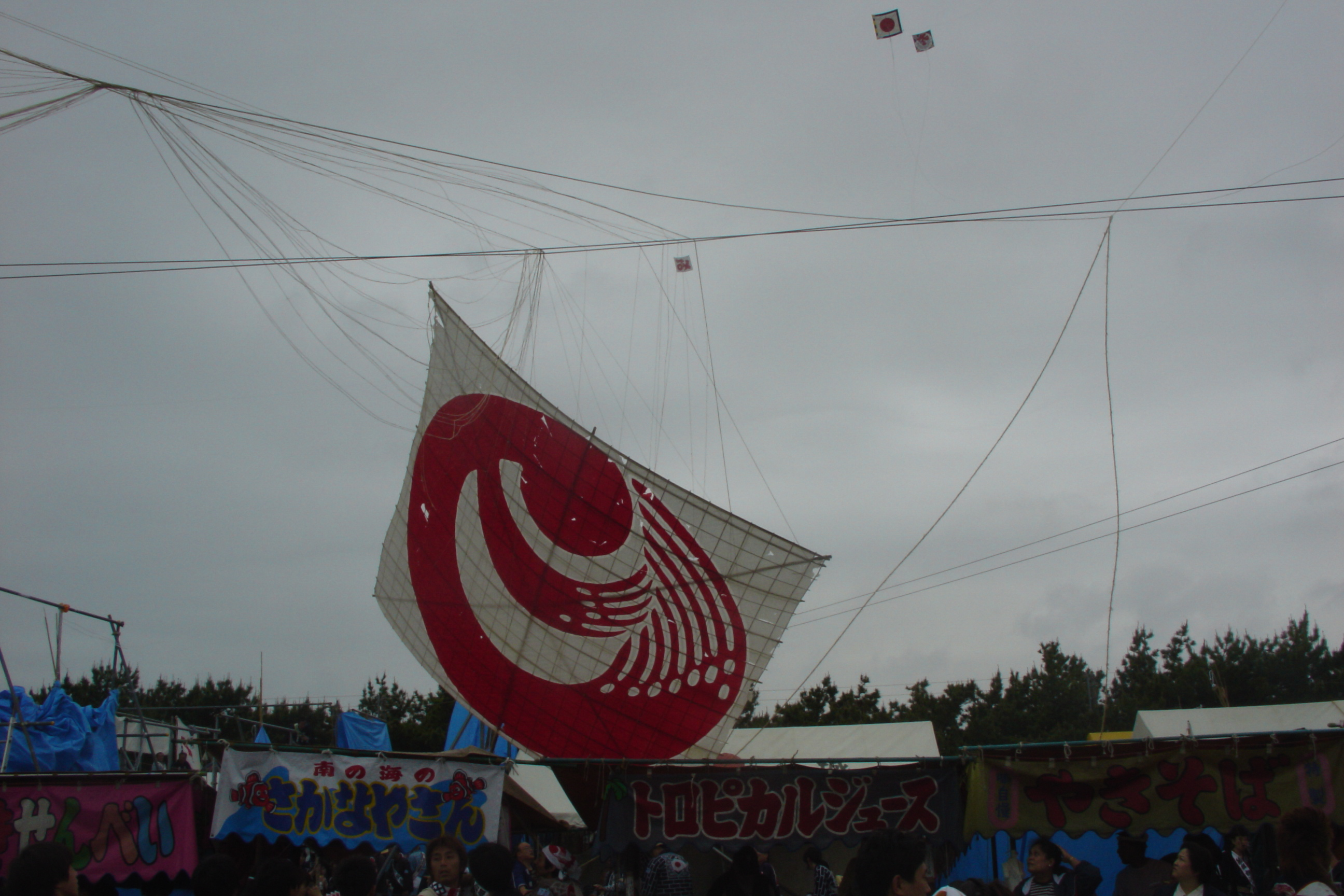
Tako of Tamachi - Tagumi (田町 - た組)

In Hamamatsu Kite Festival, the kite battle is called Takogassen(凧合戦) and is done at Takoba(凧場).

Takoba is at Nakatajima since 1967.

174 kites are there.

The kite of the first son's birth celebration is called Hatsudako(初凧).

Kite Battles

Over 170 kites will be flown into the sky, signaled by the sound of fireworks launched over the Nakatajima Sand Dunes. The first kite to be flown is the "first kite," which celebrates the birth of the first child. The firstborn child is dressed in a festival costume and is the main person to fly the kite from within his father's arms. Then, encouraged by the sound of the trumpet, many hundreds of people join in the kite battle.

On May 3 At 10:00 a.m. about 170 town kites are flown simultaneously at the signal of the opening fireworks. Then the kite battle begins. The kites are called " Kenka Tako" (fighting kites) because they are made by cutting the other kite's string through friction by twisting hemp threads of 5 mm in thick together.

=== Yatai ===
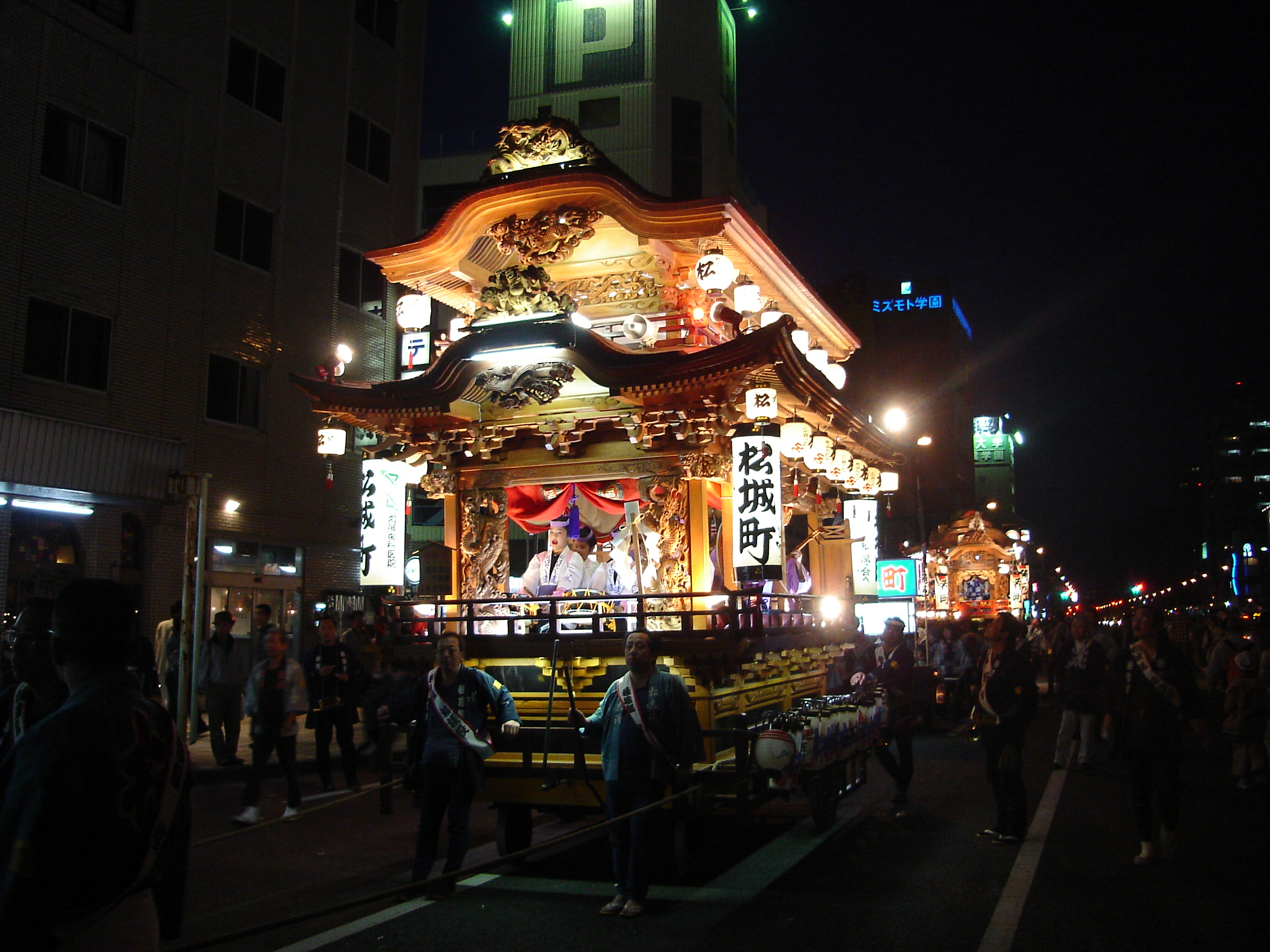
Yatai of Matsushiro-cho - Magumi (松城町 - マ組)

Yatai is also called Goden-Yatai(御殿屋台).

Float Parades

More than 80 neighborhood associations compete in this parade of floats to display the beauty of the Goten-yatai floats that decorate the downtown area. Children playing Japanese flutes and drums ride on the floats. The floats are elaborately decorated with many featuring spectacular carvings.

As night falls, the floats depart to the sounds of the shamisen played, the flutes and drums played by children wear in festival costumes and riding on the floats. They are called the ohayashi. The festival reaches its climax when the sounds of drums and flutes echo through the night sky.

=== Neri ===
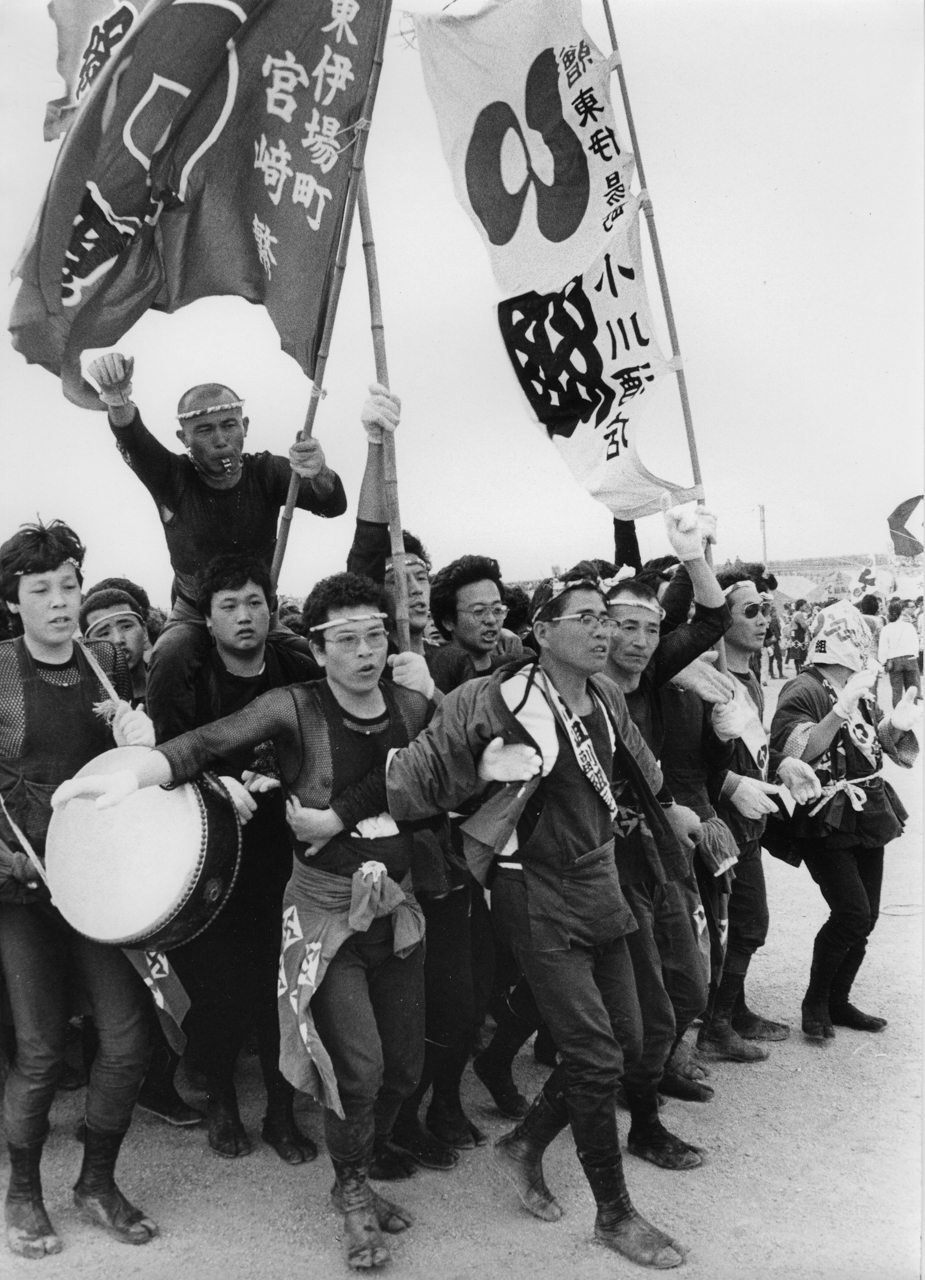
Neri of Higashiiba-cho - Igumi (東伊場町 - い組)

In Takoba, they also do Neri in order to celebrate. This is called Hatsuneri(初練り).

The neri is a parade that the lead person carries the neighborhood flag, followed by dozens of lantern bearers in each town.

At night, they gather at Hatsuko's house during the parade. At the house where the eldest son is born, their family offers cooking to everyone in order to appreciate their kite flying.

The parade is full of passion, accompanied by the sound of trumpets, drums, and the cry of "Oicho, oicho". Then, they reach a fever pitch. Participants are jostling and pushing around each other with festive excitement and they form a swirling frenzy. It is called "Gekineri".
