= Kendall Albert Johnson =

American literary and history scholar (born 1969)

Kendall Albert Johnson (born 1969) is a scholar of American literature and history. He is a full professor of Literature and the Head of the School of English at the University of Hong Kong, where he was previously a full professor of American Studies in the School of Modern Languages and Cultures (SMLC). He has also served as the Head of the SMLC (2011–2017) and as Director of the American Studies Programme (2010–2014). In 2022 he became Head of the School of English at the University of Hong Kong.

== Life and work ==
After spending his early childhood in Peoria, Illinois his family relocated to Southfield, Michigan in 1980 where he later attended University of Detroit Jesuit High School. Johnson earned degrees from the University of Michigan (BA English, Honors Program) and the University of Pennsylvania (MA, Graduate Certificate Urban Studies, and PhD) and became an Assistant Professor of English and Early American Literature at Swarthmore College, Pennsylvania in 2001 and a tenured associate professor in 2007. In 2008 he was awarded a Visiting Associate Fulbright Professor Scholarship in the American Studies Programme at the University of Hong Kong. Afterwards he became the Head of School of Modern Languages and Cultures (SMLC) and Director of the American Studies Programme at University of Hong Kong. In 2012 Johnson was the recipient of the GRF Award on the subject "Publishing China: The First American Missionaries to China and Their Faith in the Printing Press" resulting in a monograph, 3 internationally recognized peer-review publications, and 11 conference papers. He has since served two terms on the University Grants Council (UGC), become the Head of the School of English at HKU, and a member of the Research Assessment Exercise Group (RAEG) of the UGC.

Johnson's early work focused on nineteenth-century US literatures and the American author Henry James. His 2007 book "Henry James and the Visual" has been reviewed as "an important addition to scholarship on James" and another review in American Studies recommended it as well worth reading for anyone interested in understanding the powerful representational effect and meaning of the picturesque during the nineteenth century Since 2013 he serves as frequent interview guest and expert at RTHK Radio 3 and Television providing his perspective on current and historic events with US relations. His 2017 book "The New Middle Kingdom - China and the Early American Romance of Free" investigates the emergence of America’s diplomatic relationship with China and how this new alliances repositioned the US as the world’s new Middle Kingdom. This book has received favorable reviews by other scholars: Johnson has prepared the way for further explorations of how different approaches to American political economy intersected with US-China relations, and As a work of deep archival research, the book will be valuable to scholars of the US' first century... . Johnson's book has inspired others to elaborate about the content's historic relevance for U.S. policy towards China today. In 2019 he began serving on Arts and Humanities panel of the Hong Kong Research Grants Council and became a life-member of the Hong Kong Academy of the Humanities.

== Research and teaching ==
Kendall Johnson's main research and teaching subjects include American Literature from the colonial through early‐twentieth centuries, the history of literary theory, cultural studies, Native American literatures, intersections of law and literature, critical race studies, transnational comparative studies, literature and commerce, and the developing relations between China and the United States in the eighteenth and nineteenth centuries. Since 2010 he has supervised MPhil and PhD students at University of Hong Kong.

== Selected publications ==
- “Imagining Self and Community in American Indian Autobiography.” in The Columbia Guide to American Indian Literature of the United States Since 1945, edited by Eric Cheyfitz. New York: Columbia University Press, 2006. 357-409.ISBN 9780231117647
- "Critical Companion to Henry James: A Literary Reference to His Life and Work", Infobase Publishing, 2009, ISBN 978-0816068869.
- "Henry James and the Visual", Cambridge University Press, Cambridge 2007; 2011, ISBN 978-0-521-88066-4.
- "Narratives of Free Trade: The Commercial Cultures of Early US-China Relations", Hong Kong University Press, Hong Kong 2012, ISBN 978-9888083541.
- "Henry James and the China Trade", in Modern Fiction Studies 60.4 (Winter 2014): 677-710. doi:10.1353/mfs.2014.0057.
- "The New Middle Kingdom: China and the Early American Romance of Free Trade", Johns Hopkins University Press, Baltimore 2017, ISBN 978-1421422510.
- "The Sacred Fonts and Racial Frames of the American Mission Press: Mongolian Type, Chinese Exclusion, and the Transnational Figuration of Savagery", in American Quarterly 71.1 (March 2019): 1-29. doi:10.1353/aq.2019.0001.
- "The Last Puritan in Shanghai: The Faded Romance of China Trade Finance and the Queerly Transnational Melancholy of Emily Hahn's Wartime Opium Smoking," in The Oxford Handbook of Twentieth-Century American Literature," edited by Leslie Bow and Russ Castronovo, Oxford University Press, 2022: 209-245. ISBN 9780198824039.
