= Fact and fiction =

Fact and fiction may refer to:

== As a proper term ==
- Fact and Fiction, 1982 album by Twelfth Night
- Fiction and Fact, 2011 album by Beast
- Facts and Fictions, 1995 album by Asian Dub Foundation
- Fact, Fiction, and Forecast, 1955 non-fiction book by Nelson Goodman
- Analog Science Fiction and Fact, American science fiction magazine
- Science Fact and Science Fiction: An Encyclopedia, 2006 reference work written by Brian Stableford

== See also ==
- Fact-checking, the process of verifying the factual accuracy of questioned reporting and statements
- Fact and Fancy, 1962 collection of essays by Isaac Asimov
- Fact or Fiction (disambiguation)
