= American Fiction =

American fiction is fiction from America or fiction by Americans. It may additionally refer to fiction about America or Americans.

American Fiction may also refer to:

- American Fiction (band), a U.S. indie rock band
- American Fiction (film), 2023 U.S. comedy-drama film
- American Fiction (soundtrack), 2023 soundtrack album for the eponymous 2023 film

== See also ==
- The dictionary definition of Category: American fiction at Wiktionary
- Category:American fiction, for American fictions
- Fictional people of the Americas
  - Category:Fictional North American people
    - Category:Fictional American people
  - Category:Fictional South American people
- Works set in the Americas
  - Category:Works set in North America
  - Category:Works set in South America
- Works about the Americas
  - Category:Works about North America
  - Category:Works about South America
- Americas (disambiguation)
- American (disambiguation)
- America (disambiguation)
- Fiction (disambiguation)
- American literature (disambiguation)
