= Vengeance (Coldrain song) =

2024 song by Coldrain

Single by Coldrain

from the album Final Destination (XV Re:Recorded)
- Released: 11 February 2024
- Recorded: March 2023
- Studio: Studio Barbarosa (Orlando, Florida, U.S.)
- Genre: Post-hardcore; hard rock; alternative metal
- Length: 3:58
- Label: Warner Music
- Songwriters: Masato Hayakawa; Ryo Yokochi
- Producer: Michael Baskette

Coldrain singles chronology
"New Dawn" (2023)	"Vengeance" (2024)	"Incomplete" (2025)

Music video
- "Vengeance" on YouTube

"Vengeance" is a song by Japanese rock band Coldrain. Written by frontman Masato Hayakawa and lead guitarist Ryo Yokochi; it was produced by Michael Baskette at Studio Barbarosa in Orlando, Florida, US, the song was released on 11 February 2024 as the main theme for Adult Swim's anime Ninja Kamui. It was also released in tandem with the re-recording for the band's debut studio album, Final Destination (2009), for its fifteenth anniversary as the lead single for Final Destination (XV Re:Recorded).

On 29 January 2025, the band released an official live video of "Vengeance" from their performance at the Makuhari Messe in Chiba, Japan.

== Background ==
In January 2024, it was widely reported that the band were contributing an unspecified song to the anime Ninja Kamui that was releasing the following month. On 10 February, the band performed at the Nippon Gaishi Hall in their home town of Nagoya, Japan. During the performance, the band revealed "Vengeance" and debuted the song live for the first time. Simultaneously, it was announced that it was released as the lead single for Final Destination (XV Re:Recorded), to help promote the fifteenth anniversary re-recording of their debut studio album, Final Destination (2009), on a venue-only CD release limited to 3,000 copies. The following day, "Vengeance" was released digitally worldwide with an accompanying music video in tandem with Ninja Kamui's unveiling as its opening theme. To promote the single, the band starred on the cover for Spotify's "Loud Rock Japan" playlist which featured "Vengeance". Throughout late February and early March, the band embarked on a European tour where the song was played at all dates.

== Composition and lyrics ==
"Vengeance" has been described by critics as a post-hardcore, hard rock, and an alternative metal song. The song was written by the band's vocalist Masato Hayakawa and lead guitarist Ryo Yokochi, while it was produced by Michael Baskette during recording sessions at Studio Barbarosa in Orlando, Florida in March 2023. The song was written specifically for Ninja Kamui with the songs theme of revenge tied to the premise of the anime.

Speaking to Spotify for a promo clip, Hayakawa explained the meaning of "Vengeance":

""Vengeance" is a fast and furious song filled with sentiments of joy, anger, sorrow and happiness. It portrays the theme of revenge and the song is pop-ish yet edgy. Same as our last album Nonnegative, we did the recordings in Florida with the best sound produced by Elvis Baskette. Please check it out!"

== Track listing ==
No.	Title	Writer(s)	Length
1.	"Vengeance"	Masato Hayakawa; Ryo Yokochi	3:58

== Music video ==
The official music video for "Vengeance" was released on 11 February 2024, and directed by Takasuke Kato.

The video features a non-linear storyline about a grieving woman who is desired by vengeance to get revenge on a man that killed her loved-one. It shows her drawing up various plans of attack in her bedroom, while failing to execute her revenge in a club by getting shot and killed in the process. The woman fails and dies several times over, respawning back in her bedroom to revise her tactics, creating a time loop. Eventually, she experiences a breakthrough in her plan and causes chaos throughout the club of drinking bystanders, shooting and killing many guards, before confronting and killing the man who shot her loved-one. The storyline is intertwined with a performance of the band playing the song on the stage inside the club, and on an elevated platform in another dimly lit room. The music video's storyline has been compared to blockbusters John Wick and Edge of Tomorrow (both 2014). Kayla Hamilton of Wall of Sound described the music video as "a cinematic feel against the action-packed storyline."

The video amassed over 56k views in its first 24 hours upon release, and over 228,000 views in its first full week on the platform. In its first full calendar year, the music video surpassed 4 million views.

== Personnel ==
Credits adapted from Tidal.

Coldrain

- Masato Hayakawa – lead vocals, lyrics, composition
- Ryo Yokochi – lead guitar, programming, composition
- Kazuya Sugiyama – rhythm guitar
- Ryo Shimizu – bass guitar
- Katsuma Minatani – drums

Additional personnel

- Michael Baskette – producer
- Sam Guaiana – mixing
- Mike Kalajian – mastering (Rogue Planet Mastering, Gardiner, New York, US)

== Charts ==
Chart performance for "Vengeance"
Chart (2024)	Peak position
Germany Rock Airplay (GfK)	1
Japan Digital Rock (Billboard)	50
Japan Rock Airplay (Billboard)	45
Sweden Digital Rock (Sverigetopplistan)	31
