= Fact or Fiction =

Fact or Fiction may refer to:

- Beyond Belief: Fact or Fiction or Strange Truth: Fact or Fiction, a U.S. anthology TV series on FOX
  - Alien Autopsy: Fact or Fiction, predecessor to Beyond Belief: Fact or Fiction
- Food: Fact or Fiction?, a U.S. TV series on Cooking Channel
- Wikipedia: Fact or Fiction?, a web series on Loudwire

== See also ==
- Fact (disambiguation)
- Fiction (disambiguation)
