= 8AM (song) =

2009 maxi-single by Coldrain

Single by Coldrain

from the album Final Destination
- Released: 8 April 2009
- Recorded: November 2008
- Studio: Studio Sonorous Audio (Tokyo, Japan)
- Venue: Club Upset (Nagoya, Japan)
- Genre: Post-hardcore; punk rock; alternative rock
- Length: 12:38
- Label: VAP
- Songwriters: Masato Hayakawa; Ryo Yokochi
- Producers: Masato Hayakawa; Ryo Yokochi

Coldrain singles chronology
"Fiction" (2008)	"8AM" (2009)	"Final Destination" (2009)

Music video
- "8AM" on YouTube

"8AM" is the second maxi-single by Japanese rock band Coldrain. It was released on April 8, 2009 as the second single from their debut studio album Final Destination via VAP.

"8AM" was preceded by the lead single "Fiction", which were both recorded at Studio Sonorous Audio in Tokyo, Japan. Unlike "Fiction", the maxi-single included a DVD of live recordings, including the lead single "Fiction" and its B-side "Come Awake", as well as album track "Painting" and the attached music video for "8AM". The live recordings took place at a concert at Club Upset in Nagoya on 26 December 2008.

"8AM" was used as the ending theme for the anime Hajime no Ippo: New Challenger.

In 2024, the song was remastered and re-released as part of Final Destination (XV Re:Recorded), which was re-recorded for the album's fifteenth anniversary.

== Track listing ==
All lyrics written by Masato Hayakawa, all music written by Masato Hayakawa and Ryo Yokochi.

CD

CD Maxi single
No.	Title	Length
1.	"8AM"	3:31
2.	"Time to Go"	3:06
3.	"Believe"	3:53
4.	"Fiction" (Unplugged)	2:08
Total length:		12:38

DVD

DVD Maxi single
No.	Title	Length
1.	"8AM" (Music Video)	3:31
2.	"Painting" (Live Film)	3:54
3.	"Come Awake" (Live Film)	4:06
4.	"Fiction" (Live Film)	3:30
Total length:		15:03

== Music video ==
The music video for "8AM" was officially released on 8 April 2009 as part of its two disc maxi-single, though it was previously previewed on Space Shower TV prior to its release; it was directed by Suzuki Daishin. The music video was filmed at the Nakatajima Sand Dunes on the outskirts of Hamamatsu, Japan.

The music video is set in a desert where a stranded woman wakes up from her slumber, accompanied only by a red alarm clock as it hits 8AM. Confused, she grabs the clock and walks around endlessly, eventually putting down the clock down in the sand and walking away from it. Simultaneously, the band are performing the song in the desert that is intertwined with the narrative; often being shadowed by the sunrise on the horizon.

== Personnel ==
Credits retrieved from singles' liner notes.

Coldrain

- Masato David Hayakawa (マサト, Masato) – lead vocals, composition lyrics, production
- Ryo Yokochi (ヨコチ, Y.K.C.) – lead guitar, programming, keyboards, production, composition
- Kazuya Sugiyama (スギ, Sugi) – rhythm guitar, backing vocals
- Ryo Shimizu (リョウ, RxYxO) – bass guitar, backing vocals
- Katsuma Minatani (カツマ, Katsuma) – drums, percussion

Additional personnel

- Koichi Hara – engineering, mixing
- Hokuto Fukami – assistant engineer
- Alan Douches – mastering (West West Side Music, New Windsor, New York, US)

== Charts ==
Chart (2009)	Peak position
Japan Singles (Oricon)	111
