= Stance Punks =

Japanese punk rock band

- Origin: Japan
- Genres: Punk rock
- Years active: 1998–present
- Label: Sony Music Japan
- Members: TSURU; KINYA; TETSUSHI; KOH
- Website: stancepunks.net

Stance Punks are a Japanese punk rock band, formed in 1998. The band gained fame through their performances at a rooftop live-venue in Shimokitazawa.

Stance Punks' name spread overseas when their song "Mayonaka Shounen Totsugekidan" was used as the ending theme song for the movie Battle Royale 2. Their song "No Boy No Cry" has been used as the opening theme song for the anime Naruto and the song "I Wanna Be" was used as the ending theme song for the anime Soul Eater. As of 2005, the band has signed with Sony Epic's label called "Kowalski Records" under which the single "Mony Mony Mony" was released.

Critics often cite similarities between them and The Blue Hearts, an immensely popular punk band with a very similar style of music.

The band recently performed a five-hour long "Naruto Tribute" broadcast from a popular Kyoto radio station.

On January 3, 2021, the band announced the departure of Katsuda Kinya, guitarist and founding member of Stance Punks since 1998.

Band members include:

- Tsuru (Vocals)
- Katsuda Kinya (Guitar)
- Tetsushi Kawasaki (Bassist)
- Satou Koh (Drums)

== Discography ==
=== Albums ===
2000.5.4 Shimokitazawa Rooftop (Released 8/18/2000)

Stance Punks (Mini album) (Released 8/21/2001)

Stance Punks (Released 20/12/2002)

Let It Roll (Released 7/7/2004)

Howling Idol (Shine Nakatta Dengeki Yarou) (Released 7/20/2005)

Bubblegum Viking (Released 11/15/2006)

Bomp! Bomp! Bomp! (Mini album) (Released 3/5/2008)

Peace & Destroy (Released 12/10/2008)

The World Is Mine (Released 02/03/2010)

STANCE PUNKS MANIA 1998-2012 (Released 06/05/2013)

P.I.N.S (Released 11/04/2015)

Aoban Akaban (Released 14/11/2018)

changes (Released 04/09/2022)

=== Singles ===
Kusottare Kaihouku (Released 4/10/2002)

Saitei Saikou 999/Zassou no Hana (Released 6/11/2003)

Lost Boys March (Released 5/5/2004)

19roll (Released 6/9/2004)

Mony Mony Mony (Released 03/24/2005)

No Boy, No Cry (Released 06/8/2005)

Sharol wa Blue (Released 05/24/2006)

Let It Rock (Released 08/2/2006)

I Wanna Be (Released 06/4/2008)

Stay Young / Genpatsu Song (Released 11/05/2011)

SHE (Released 08/07/2015)

Yume no Gakudan / Paper Screen Diary (Released 01/04/2017)

Tamashii no Uta / Mother Lake (Released 15/07/2018)

Shimokitazawa Ereji / Haru no Michishirube (Released 13/07/2019)

Sekai Zenmetsu (Released 23/11/2021)

=== Video and DVD ===
Ichigeki Hissatsu (6/11/2003)

PV/DV mania! (12/7/2005)

10th Anniversary Live One Man (3/9/2008)

SHE CD, Bakuretsu LIVE 2013 (08/07/2015)

20th Anniversary Hinotama Sengen Festival (22/09/2018)

Save the Last Dance for Me! 2021.08.14 LIVE AT CLUB CITTA (23/11/2021)
