= Fiction (Coldrain song) =

2008 maxi-single by Coldrain

Single by Coldrain

from the album Final Destination
- Released: November 5, 2008
- Recorded: August 2008
- Studio: Studio Sonorous Audio (Tokyo, Japan)
- Genre: Post-hardcore; punk rock; alternative rock
- Length: 12:04
- Label: VAP
- Songwriters: Masato Hayakawa; Ryo Yokochi
- Producers: Masato Hayakawa; Ryo Yokochi

Coldrain singles chronology
"Fiction" (2008)	"8AM" (2009)

Music video
- "Fiction" on YouTube

"Fiction" is the debut single and first maxi-single by Japanese rock band Coldrain. It was released on November 5, 2008 as the lead single from their debut studio album Final Destination.

Before this single, the band had recorded and handed out demo CDs containing early recordings of "Painting" and "My Addiction". To help spread their name, they handed out demos of this record around Nagoya to help encourage people to go to their shows. "Fiction" was the only song off this maxi-single to be included on Coldrain's debut studio album Final Destination. However, the song was remastered for the album to produce a different sound to what it was on the maxi single version.

Later on in his career, frontman Masato Hayakawa stated that when making this record he did not think they would ever get noticed or succeed because of the quality and chemistry of them all as a band. He also stated that they were signed to a major label far too early in their lifespan.

In 2024, the song was remastered and re-released as part of Final Destination (XV Re:Recorded), which was re-recorded for the album's fifteenth anniversary.

== Track listing ==
All lyrics written by Masato Hayakawa, all music written by Masato Hayakawa and Ryo Yokochi, except when noted.

"Fiction" CD Maxi Single
No.	Title	Writer(s)	Length
1.	"Fiction"		3:31
2.	"Come Awake"	Masato Hayakawa; Kazuya Sugiyama	3:42
3.	"I Know"		4:51
Total length:			12:04

== Music video ==
The music video for "Fiction" was premiered and promoted on Space Shower TV a week before the release of the single on 29 October 2008. The video was directed by Suzuki Daishin.

The music video takes place in a seemingly abandoned house which follows the storyline of a man, played by frontman Masato Hayakawa, and a woman who are in a dysfunctional relationship. In the end, it is revealed that the relationship is fake, which plays into the meaning of the song. The band playing the song and jamming out is intertwined with the storyline.

== Personnel ==
Credits retrieved from singles' liner notes.

Coldrain

- Masato David Hayakawa (マサト, Masato) – lead vocals, lyricist, producer
- Ryo Yokochi (ヨコチ, Y.K.C.) – lead guitar, programming, keyboards, producer, composer
- Kazuya Sugiyama (スギ, Sugi) – rhythm guitar, backing vocals
- Ryo Shimizu (リョウ, RxYxO) – bass guitar, backing vocals
- Katsuma Minatani (カツマ, Katsuma) – drums, percussion

Additional personnel

- Koichi Hara – recording engineer, mixing
- Hokuto Fukami – assistant engineer
- Hiromichi Takiguchi – mastering (Parasight Mastering, Tokyo)

== Charts ==
Chart (2008)	Peak position
Japan Singles (Oricon)	181
