= Ninja Kamui =

Japanese anime television series

- Cover art for the Japanese Blu-ray release of the series featuring Higan (left), Zai (right) and Yamaji (background)
- Genre: Action; Science fiction
- Written by: Shigeru Murakoshi
- Directed by: Sunghoo Park
- Voices of: Kenjiro Tsuda; Atsushi Ono; Yuki Wakai; Kazuhiro Yamaji; Yuichi Nakamura; Tatsumaru Tachibana; Takashi Nagasako
- Music by: R.O.N
- Opening theme: "Vengeance" by Coldrain
- Ending theme: "Eye Openers" by Jessica Gelinas
- Countries of origin: Japan; United States
- Original language: Japanese (Note: Sentai Studios was commissioned to produce the English dub and sub.)
- No. of seasons: 1
- No. of episodes: 13

Production
- Executive producer: Jason DeMarco
- Producer: Joseph Chou
- Cinematography: Jumi Lee
- Editor: Keisuke Yanagi
- Running time: 23 minutes
- Production companies: Sola Entertainment; Williams Street (Note: Executive production)

Original release
- Network: Adult Swim (US); Tokyo MX (JP) (Note: Since Tokyo MX was the only television station to broadcast the series in Japan, it aired exclusively in the Greater Tokyo Area. A nationwide streaming release subsequently followed each aired episode.)
- Release: February 11, 2024 – present

Ninja Kamui (stylized in all caps) is an anime television series produced by E&H Production and Sola Entertainment for Cartoon Network's nighttime programming block Adult Swim. It was directed by Sunghoo Park. The series aired in the United States on Adult Swim's Toonami programming block, along with an Adult Swim Canada simulcast, from February to May 2024. A Japanese broadcast of the series followed on Tokyo MX from July to September 2024. In June 2025, a second and third season were announced.

== Plot ==
After escaping his clan and going into hiding in rural America with his wife, former ninja Higan, living under the alias of Joe Logan, is ambushed by the reformed clan's assassins which exact bloody retribution on him and his family for their betrayal on direct orders from their current leader Yamaji. With his wife and son now dead, Higan returns to his ninja ways to avenge his family and sets his sights on taking down the very clan that made him.

== Characters ==
Higan / Joe Logan (ヒガン / ジョー・ローガン, Higan / Jō Rōgan)
Voiced by: Kenjiro Tsuda^{Ep. 1 credits} (Japanese); Jeremy Gee^{Ep. 2 credits} (Higan); Gabriel Regojo^{Ep. 1 credits} (Logan) (English)
A former ninja who goes on a journey to avenge his family. Joe and his family lived under the surname alias Logan and concealed their real faces with devices in an attempt to avoid detection from the clan.
Mari / Sara Logan (マリ / サラ・ローガン, Mari / Sara Rōgan)
Voiced by: Yuriko Hino^{Ep. 1 credits} (Japanese); Christie Guidry^{Ep. 2 credits} (Mari); Chaney Moore^{Ep. 1 credits} (Sara) (English)
Higan's wife, and a former ninja, who was trained alongside Higan and Zai. She is murdered along with Ren by the clan.
Ren / Kyle Logan (レン / カイル・ローガン, Ren / Kairu Rōgan)
Voiced by: Arata Kimura^{Ep. 1 credits} (Japanese); Noble Hutchison^{Ep. 1 credits} (English)
Higan and Mari's son who celebrated his birthday on the day of the clan's attack. He is murdered along with Mari by the clan.
Mike Moriss (マイク・モリス, Maiku Morisu)
Voiced by: Atsushi Ono^{Ep. 1 credits} (Japanese); Shawn Hamilton^{Ep. 1 credits} (English)
An FBI agent investigating the deaths of Joe's family and partners with Samanda.
Aska / Emma Samanda (アスカ / エマ・サマンダ, Asuka / Ema Samanda)
Voiced by: Yuki Wakai^{Ep. 1 credits} (Japanese); Luci Christian^{Ep. 1 credits} (English)
An FBI agent investigating the deaths of Joe's family and partners with Moriss. She is later revealed to be Aska, a top member of the organization who saved Higan's life.
Boss Ninja (ボス忍者, Bosu Ninja)
Voiced by: Tomoyuki Shimura^{Ep. 1 credits} (Japanese); Heath Morrow^{Ep. 1 credits} (English)
The imposing head of the ninja clan's former ninja hunting squad and the one who personally murders Higan's family.
Yamaji (ヤマジ)
Voiced by: Kazuhiro Yamaji^{Ep. 2 credits} (Japanese); Luis Galindo^{Ep. 2 credits} (English)
Higan's old clan master and the one sending assassins after him and all other exiled ninjas in order to prevent the spread of their secret arts.
Zai (ザイ)
Voiced by: Yuichi Nakamura^{Ep. 2 credits} (Japanese); James Marler^{Ep. 2 credits} (English)
A skilled ninja known as the Reaper and Yamaji's apprentice. He also hunts exiled ninjas.
Old Chieftain / Kagari (老酋長 / カガリ, Rōshūchō / Kagari)
Voiced by: Takayuki Sugō^{Ep. 4 credits} (Old Chieftain); Takaya Hashi^{Ep. 2 credits} (Kagari) (Japanese); David Harbold^{Ep. 4 credits} (Old Chieftain); Sean Patrick Judge^{Ep. 2 credits} (Kagari) (English)
A skilled doctor in the ninja underworld and Higan's old acquaintance. In actuality, he is a disguise for the previous head of the ninja clan, who inducted Higan, Mari and Zai.
Lil (リル, Riru)
Voiced by: Setsuji Satō^{Ep. 3 credits} (Japanese); Brandon Hearnsberger^{Ep. 3 credits} (English)
A capricious and perverted assassin afflicted with dwarfism who relies on technology for battle.
Joseph Evans (ジョセフ・エヴァンス, Josefu Evuansu)
Voiced by: Tatsumaru Tachibana^{Ep. 3 credits} (Japanese); Scott Gibbs^{Ep. 3 credits} (English)
The founder and CEO of the tech company AUZA who is in a partnership with Yamaji to provide highly advanced tech weaponry for the clan.
Dilly (ヂリ, Djiri)
Voiced by: Romi Park^{Ep. 4 credits} (Japanese); Elissa Cuellar^{Ep. 4 credits} (English)
Joseph's bodyguard and a highly skilled combatant.
Big D (ビッグ・D, Biggu Dī)
Voiced by: Kosuke Sakaki^{Ep. 4 credits} (Japanese); Joe P^{Ep. 4 credits} (English)
A vain African American ninja outfitted with cybernetic implants.
Jason Cardenas (ジェイソン・カルデナス, Jeison Karudenasu)
Voiced by: Takashi Nagasako^{Ep. 5 credits} (Japanese); Joe Daniels^{Ep. 5 credits} (English)
A disgruntled former AUZA employee with valuable insider knowledge. His design is based on the show's executive producer Jason DeMarco.

== Production and release ==
The series was announced by Adult Swim in May 2022, and directed by Sunghoo Park. Shigeru Murakoshi handled series composition, while Takashi Okazaki designed the characters. The series was produced by E&H Production and Sola Entertainment. In July 2023 at San Diego Comic-Con, Adult Swim unveiled a teaser trailer for the series and announced it would premiere in 2024. In January 2024, Adult Swim announced that the series would premiere on its Toonami programming block on February 11, 2024, in both English dubbed and subtitled formats, both produced by Sentai Studios.

The opening theme song is "Vengeance", performed by Japanese rock band Coldrain, while the ending theme song is "Eye Openers", performed by Jessica Gelinas. The respective ending theme songs for episodes 10 and 13 are "Unbroken" and "Chain Reaction", both performed by Toft Willingham. Insert songs are also used within most episodes.

In June 2024, Sola Entertainment CEO Joseph Chou was paraphrased through a Business Wire press release covering the Shinobi Origins video game as stating that a second season of the anime was in the works, however several hours after its publication, the show's executive producer Jason DeMarco replied to a Bluesky post that a second season had "not been announced". The following day, the press release was retracted and Chou responded to an inquiry from Anime News Network, clarifying that the game's public relations staff had inserted the quote themselves and that, while ideas were being considered for a potential second season, "there is nothing official at all". In June 2025, Adult Swim announced at the Annecy International Animation Film Festival that the anime series was being renewed for a second and third season. The second season, titled Ninja Kamui: Red Vendetta, is currently in production and will follow Higan as he uncovers a new conspiracy of cataclysmic proportions.

=== Episodes ===
No. overall	No. in season	Episode	Insert song (Note: Insert song information is taken from the ending credits of each episode.)	Directed by (Note: Production staff information is taken from the ending credits of each episode.)	Written by	Storyboarded by	English air date	Japanese air date
1	1	Episode 1	"Stillness" performed by Steve Memmolo	Sunghoo Park	Shigeru Murakoshi	Sunghoo Park	February 11, 2024	July 2, 2024
In a city, a young man attempts to escape masked ninja assailants chasing him, but is caught and beheaded by their boss. Elsewhere, Joe Logan, his wife Sara and son Kyle are enjoying their daily life in the corn fields of rural America. Joe and Sara celebrate Kyle's birthday, but that night the family is ambushed by ninjas. After defeating some downstairs, Joe runs back to the bedroom to find that they already murdered his wife and son before Joe himself is seemingly killed. Joe miraculously awakens in a morgue and is later approached in the hospital by FBI agents Mike Moriss and Emma Samanda, who have arrived to investigate. Both decide to stay overnight and watch over Joe. On the hospital's rooftop, Joe is once again ambushed by ninjas, but he battles his way down the hospital, killing all the assailants except the leader. Joe reveals his true face and identity as Higan after the boss states he cannot conceal himself from the clan. Higan returns home and retrieves a box containing a few personal belongings concealed inside a wall before burning the house down, placing his old ninja mask from the box back on.
2	2	Episode 2	"Erupt" performed by Michael "Kasper" Abruzzese	Hiroki Itai	Shigeru Murakoshi	Sunghoo Park	February 18, 2024	July 9, 2024
After receiving medical assistance from an old colleague named Kagari, Higan tortures the boss ninja at an abandoned factory. Though he fails to uncover any useful information, Higan continues the torture out of vengeance before burning him alive. Higan travels by motorcycle across the southwestern U.S. in an attempt to find the clan's American hideout, but to no avail. Back at headquarters, the FBI has seemingly covered up the ninja incident. Mike and Emma lay low to continue their investigation into the Logans. Higan contacts Mike and agrees to a meeting the following night at a Chinese restaurant in San Francisco. After getting Higan to confess that the Logan identity was a cover, Mike holds him at gunpoint and attempts to bring him in for questioning before they are attacked by two ninjas disguised as a single food delivery man. Higan kills the attackers before the restaurant is barraged by bullets and a rocket launcher from disguised men traveling via van. Higan escapes and Mike is left to wonder who created the attacker's blades that were able to pierce his body armor during the assault. In an undisclosed location, ninja clan master Yamaji receives word from Zai that Higan is still alive.
3	3	Episode 3	"We Gon' Do Thi$" performed by Chez	Hiro Ohki	Akira Kindaichi	Sunghoo Park	February 25, 2024	July 16, 2024
Yamaji meets up with the assassin Lil after his latest mission and the two discuss Higan's prowess as a ninja. Elsewhere, Zai eliminates his former swordmaster who defected from the clan. Mike joins forces with Higan after the FBI and police cover up the incident at the restaurant and frames the owner on false charges. They meet up with Emma and discover a likely connection between multinational corporation AUZA and the clan, and suspect they might be conspiring together to eliminate mutual enemies. Meanwhile, Yamaji meets with AUZA's top executive Joseph, who sent the men responsible for shooting up the restaurant, and warns him not to engage exiled ninjas without his consent. Meanwhile, Higan, Mike, and Emma's discuss AUZA City, they are attacked by a masked ninja who tries to kill them through the car roof. During the assault, the car is hit by a truck that seemingly incapacitates both Mike and Emma. After the crash, Higan engages the ninja in battle and successfully kills them as Lil watches from a mounted bodycam. Afterward, Higan receives a phone call from an unknown number.
4	4	Episode 4	"Bitter Sweet" performed by Steve Memmolo	Yui Miura	Shigeru Murakoshi	Hiroki Itai	March 3, 2024	July 23, 2024
The mysterious number tells Higan that it's impossible to infiltrate AUZA City without help and offers their services, hinting they also have connections with the ninja clan. Mike and Emma recover at the hospital after the car accident and Higan notifies them about the benefactor. Emma uncovers unrelated potential assistance with a disgruntled former AUZA employee on the dark web and Mike decides meet up with them. Inside AUZA City, Yamaji, Joseph, and other top brass of the clan meet up to discuss their suspicion that Higan will soon infiltrate the city. In a flashback, Higan, Mari, and Zai's relationship as members of the clan and how Higan and Mari broke the clan's code are revealed. After being discharged from the hospital, Mike receives word that Emma has been assigned a new case by their boss and the two go their separate ways after dinner. At sunset, Higan begins his infiltration into the city by accessing their underground tunnel networks with hacking help from the benefactor. Higan is just about to enter the city's parameters when he is suddenly confronted by Zai, who is waiting for him on the other side.
5	5	Episode 5	"Legend Begin" performed by Michael "Kasper" Abruzzese	Sunghoo Park	Ko Yoneyama	Sunghoo Park	March 10, 2024	July 30, 2024
Higan misses his chance to enter AUZA City and Zai warns him that he has merely delayed his death before leaving. Elsewhere, in a ghost town, Mike meets up with a former AUZA employee named Jason Cardenas who turns out to have insider knowledge into accessing AUZA's servers. In the city, the clan's top brass decide to willingly let Higan in to directly confront him and plan a timed fireworks festival to distract the city's populous. Mike and Jason successfully hack into AUZA's servers and uncover a list of fake identities being used to plant operatives before suddenly being denied access. After being cornered by mercenaries, the two manage to escape, but are chased down, eventually crashing off the side of the road. In the city, Higan cuts down hordes of ninjas and mercenaries before confronting four lieutenant ninjas donning armor suits. Higan attempts to directly confront Yamaji, but the lieutenant ninjas overpower him, even after using his secret art. Laying defeated on the ground, Higan is about to be beheaded by Zai before one of the lieutenants rescues him and escapes.
6	6	Episode 6	"Super Volcano" performed by Toft Willingham	Masataka Akai	Akira Kindaichi	Sunghoo Park	March 17, 2024	August 6, 2024
The organization begins searching the city for the lieutenant and Higan. After retreating to treat Higan's wounds, the lieutenant reveals herself to be Emma, otherwise known as Aska. She explains that she was sent by the clan in order to spy on him under the guise of a rookie FBI agent. Aska informs Higan that it will be virtually impossible to defeat the organization without using an armored suit, known as Gusoku Gear, and informs him that she has taken the Kamui, the most advanced model during their escape. To use it, Higan must be directly synched to the suit via neural pathways for it to function. Before putting him into deep sleep for the procedure, Aska confirms she was the one who saved him back during the ambush that killed his family, and also helped him infiltrate the city. Lil manages to locate their hideout and Aska engages him in battle, but is defeated when her suit's recharge station is destroyed. During the synching, Aska subconsciously relays to Higan that she was only able to save him because she didn't arrive in time. She explains that Mari saved her life long ago and that the two of them stayed in touch. Higan finishes synching and confronts Lil in the Kamui.
7	7	Episode 7	"Super Volcano" performed by Toft Willingham	Hisatoshi Shimizu	Akira Kindaichi	Yui Miura	March 24, 2024	August 13, 2024
Using the Kamui suit, Higan defeats Lil and sends his severed head back to AUZA headquarters. Yamaji consequently decides to speed up his plans and gives Zai permission to go after Higan. Back inside her truck, Aska explains to Higan how during her childhood, her face was severely disfigured in an accident and she was abandoned by her parents. She was eventually adopted by the former clan chieftain to become a ninja, becoming a master of disguise and "watcher" of sorts for him. Aska and Mari developed a close personal bond with each other against ninja conventions. As the former chieftain succumbed to illness, Yamaji became leader and took the clan away from Japan, in turn alienating many members. Meanwhile, Mari had secretly developed a face-changing device which she shared with the dissidents. When Mari became pregnant with Higan's child, they were forced to flee and go into hiding. Aska tells Higan that she decided to stay in order to uncover what future Yamaji was planning for the clan.
8	8	Episode 8	"Bitter Sweet" performed by Steve Memmolo	Yui Miura	Ko Yoneyama	Sunghoo Park	March 31, 2024	August 20, 2024
Yamaji and the organization leave the city to hasten their plans. Aska tells Higan that AUZA's endgame is to seize all energy infrastructure and assume control of each country from within, all the while using the clan as their muscle. Higan and Aska launch an electromagnetic pulse to disable the entire electrical network of AUZA City and escape the barrier. The two of them head to an AUZA power plant to steal portal energy tanks for their suits, with foresight that a lieutenant might be present. Aska enters the plant and is confronted by Big D in his Gusoku Gear. Higan arrives in the Kamui and the two brawl while Aska disables the plant's charger by blowing it up. Higan saves Aska as the floor collapses and Big D allows them to leave due to his personal honor code. Back on the road, they discover Aska's computer is being used and suspect it's Mike. They track him and Jason down to a motel and Aska confesses her true identity to Mike, much to his frustration for her not allowing him to help knowing the truth. Now on the same page, the group turn their attention towards the organization.
9	9	Episode 9	"Legend Begin" performed by Michael "Kasper" Abruzzese "Bitter Sweet" performed by Steve Memmolo	Takayuki Sano	Shigeru Murakoshi	Takayuki Sano	April 7, 2024	August 27, 2024
Joseph scolds Yamaji for not keeping Big D in check but is reminded that the partnership can turn at any one of his missteps. Meanwhile, Emma and Jason plan to directly hack AUZA's internal networks to retrieve dirt on the company. Thanks to a tracking device placed by Big D from the previous battle, they are found by the organization and a battle ensues. Aska and Mike eliminate AUZA gunmen while Higan battles Big D and Jason continues to hack the company servers. Mike is shot, but is saved by his protective vest as he and Aska finish killing off the remaining gunmen. Higan defeats Big D, who praises Higan and asks Aska why she betrayed them. She admits she was never on their side to begin with: satisfied with her answer, he accepts his fate. Before Higan is able to finish the job, Joseph remote detonates Big D's Gusoku Gear: he is obliterated, but saves Higan with last piece of Gear. Aska receives fatal damage from the blast and gives her final words to Higan and Mike before dying. The men say their final goodbyes before burning her body, with Higan feeling even more determined to take down the entire organization. Meanwhile, Zai's very own Gusoku Gear finishes production.
10	10	Episode 10	"Unbroken" performed by Toft Willingham	Hisatoshi Shimizu	Akira Kindaichi	Sunghoo Park	April 14, 2024	September 3, 2024
Zai's orphaned childhood and how he ended up joining the clan is revealed. In the present, Higan and company bury Emma's body in the desert. The group holds top secret AUZA data that is unfortunately now encrypted in Emma's computer, leaving Jason to have to decode it all by himself. To make matters worse, they have been publicly disclosed to the media as ecological terrorists targeting AUZA power plants. A message crow arrives for Higan with a duel challenge from Zai. In flashbacks, its revealed how Higan, Mari, and Zai rose to the top within the clan and became an elite ninja trio. After Higan and Mari depart the clan and become exiles, Zai felt they betrayed their bond and warned that they would regret it if they didn't kill him. Back in the present, Higan arrives at the duel location to battle Zai and the two begin their deathmatch in their Gusoku Gear while Mike unsuccessfully confronts his boss about the AUZA-tied corruption within the FBI.
11	11	Episode 11	N/A	Yui Miura	Shigeru Murakoshi	Sunghoo Park	April 21, 2024	September 10, 2024
Higan and Zai destroy their Gusoku Gear while fighting and start battling man-to-man, exchanging blows and using their secret arts. Zai is infuriated that Higan and Mari not only broke the clan's code, but betrayed the pact they made together as he truly believed he had made friends for the first time in his life. Higan defeats Zai and tells him that they left because the code held them back from loving the ones they hold dear and was told by Mari that their son Ren could show Zai the future beyond being a ninja. Elsewhere, Mike returns to find Jason still hasn't regained access to the data, needing some form of biometrics from Aska to access it. Mike remembers a keepsake from his deceased daughter that Aska touched, and Jason uses it to retrieve the data. As Mike buys him time by diverting all police attention towards himself, Jason goes into hiding to access the data. Meanwhile, Joseph has a falling out with Yamaji and the clan as he discovers they're conspiring to betray AUZA and unsuccessfully attempts to kill him with armed soldiers. Yamaji and his men arrive at AUZA headquarters to assassinate Joseph. Dilly arrives and helps Joseph escape the facility before confronting Yamaji.
12	12	Episode 12	N/A	Hiroki Itai	Ko Yoneyama	Hiroki Itai	April 28, 2024	September 17, 2024
A suited up Dilly combats Yamaji, who reveals the perfected version of the Gusoku Gear. Dilly is flung from the tower and killed by Yamaji. Meanwhile, Kagari meets up with Higan and unveils his true identity as the former clan chieftain. He tells Higan that he had been watching him, Mari, and Zai, sensing a wavering of the clan's code through them. He knew that the organization would eventually meet its end if he didn't make changes. However, the code's binding ran so deep that he was unable to find a new purpose for the clan. Yamaji decided to take matters into his own hands and assassinated the chieftain, but he survived and lost his ninja abilities as a result. Higan explains to him that he isn't exacting retribution for the clan, but for the sake of his family and friends that he shares bonds with. Being held for questioning at the FBI, Mike holds his employers responsible by having Jason leak the sensitive AUZA data out to the public, withholding the names of those tied to the FBI and US government as leverage to make them take direct action on Joseph. The FBI sends out an arrest warrant for him but soon thereafter automated versions of the Gusoku Gear, under the control of Yamaji, intrude on public officials' locations and hold them hostage. Higan heads back to AUZA City to confront Yamaji.
13	13	Episode 13	"Super Volcano" and "Chain Reaction" performed by Toft Willingham	Sunghoo Park	Shigeru Murakoshi	Sunghoo Park	May 5, 2024	September 24, 2024
As Yamaji holds the nation's leaders hostage, Higan arrives in the city. Meanwhile, with the assistance of the FBI and Jason, Mike speeds after Joseph in the remote canyon fields, who's planning to escape the country via cargo plane. After disabling the plane with his own car, Mike chases after Joseph on foot and successfully captures him after a brief scuffle. Higan confronts Yamaji and a fight in their Gusoku Gear ensues. Zai arrives mid-brawl and assists Yamaji, declaring his allegiance to the ninja life. Higan uses his secret art but is countered by Yamaji's own art which is able to mess with his mind. Yamaji attempts to kill Higan while he's hallucinating, but Zai suddenly turns on him. An angered Yamaji brings the fight underground to use the city's energy core for his suit, battering Higan until he is no longer able to move. Higan is about to give up when he has a vision of Mari, who reminds him that he still has the power to do anything he puts his mind to. Higan gets up and uses Zai's secret art to defeat the chieftain. As he lays dying, Yamaji questions why Higan would want to snuff out peace for the world when it was right at their fingertips. Higan proclaims him to be a hypocrite as he snuffed out other peoples' peace before the chieftain succumbs to his injuries. The automated Gusoku are disabled by exiled ninjas and Joseph is sent to prison as Mike silently thanks Higan for ending the conflict. Zai attempts to commit suicide to atone for turning on Yamaji, but Higan stops him, telling him that the ninja is over and that he's free to live his own future. Some time later, Higan dumps his Gusoku Gear into a river and rides off into the countryside.

== Video game ==
A video game prequel titled Ninja Kamui: Shinobi Origins was released on May 30, 2024, for the Nintendo Switch. The game was developed by G.rev and published by Rainmaker Productions. It was later ported to PlayStation 4 on November 13, 2024.

== Reception ==
=== Critical response ===
Rafael Motamayor of IGN gave the series a score of 7/10. He praised the "stunning" action sequences but criticized the dull plot, uninteresting characters, and called the CG animation "uninspiring" and "underwhelming".

=== Accolades ===
In 2024, Ninja Kamui was nominated for Best Anime Series at the 4th Astra TV Awards. The series won Best Original Anime at the 9th Crunchyroll Anime Awards in 2025.
