= Inter-American literature =

Inter-American literature involves the comparative study of authors and texts from all the Americas: North, South and Central, including the Caribbean. This all-inclusive scope—Canada, the United States, Spanish America, Brazil, smaller Anglophone and Francophone countries, and Native America—covers the principal languages of the extreme Western Hemisphere—English, Spanish, Portuguese, French—as well as, in some cases, indigenous languages.

The method can have a broad focus, as in studies of race relations in the Americas or the literary representation of the Native American, or it can focus more narrowly on issues of influence and reception that link specific authors and texts. For example, certain novels by Brazil's Machado de Assis influenced John Barth's The Floating Opera, and Faulkner influenced a number of writers from Spanish America, including Gabriel García Márquez and Mario Vargas Llosa.

Inter-American Literature can also deal with the development of certain literary forms, such as the immigrant novel or the New-World epic poem, or with literary periods and movements, such as the colonial period, the nineteenth-century, or Modernism in the Americas.

Ideally, every Inter-American Literature project should involve at least two of the New World's languages and literatures, as, for instance, in a study of the “New Novel” form in Canada, the United States, Peru, and Brazil during the 1960s.

As in comparative studies generally, inter-American literary scholarship should work, as often as possible, with texts written in their original languages and should seek to identify those similarities (of theme, form, or period) that tie the literatures of the Americas together while also recognizing and maintaining the very important differences (of history, style, and culture) that distinguish them and that make them separate works of art.

At present, Inter-American Literature is mostly dominated by U.S. scholars. The fact that the U.S. has become the prime locus of production of Inter-American studies poses several problems, the most important of which is that the field betrays its own raison-d'etre. The field cannot be truly inter-American when most American countries are relegated to the position of object of study.

== Sources ==
Earl E. Fitz. Rediscovering the New World: Inter-American Literature in a Comparative Context. Iowa U P, 1991.

Elizabeth Lowe and Earl E. Fitz. Translation and the Rise of Inter-American Literature, U P of Florida, 2008.

Earl E. Fitz. Inter-American Literature: A Concise History. The Scholar Collection, 2012. (473 pp.) www.academicpub.com

Nina Scott. Inter-American Literature: An Antidote to the Arrogance of Culture. College English. 2004.

Monika Kaup, Debra J. Rosenthal, eds. Mixing race, mixing culture. U Texas P, 2002.

Earl E. Fitz. Spanish American and Brazilian Literature in Inter-American Perspective: The Comparative Approach. CLCWeb: Comparative Literature and Culture 4.2 (2002).
