= Fiction (disambiguation) =

Fiction is a story created by the imagination in any medium (e.g., moving pictures, plays, etc.).

Fiction may also refer to:

== Arts, entertainment, and media ==
=== Literature ===
- Prose fiction, "literature in the form of prose, especially short stories and novels, that describes imaginary events and people" (New Oxford American Dictionary)
- Science fiction

=== Music ===
==== Groups and labels ====
- Fiction Records, The Cure's former record label
- Fictional (band), Funker Vogt side project led by Gerrit Thomas

==== Albums ====
- Fiction (The Comsat Angels album), 1982
- Fiction (Yuki Kajiura album), 2003
- Fiction (Dark Tranquillity album), 2007
- Fiction (Mukala album), 1998
- Fiction (Yoga Lin album), 2012
- Fictions (album) by Jane Birkin, 2006
- Fiction, 2018 EP by Sumika
- Fiction (EP), 2020 EP by Suuns

==== Songs ====
- "Fiction" (Coldrain song), a single by Coldrain from their 2009 album Final Destination
- "Fiction", a song by Joni Mitchell from her 1985 album Dog Eat Dog
- "Fiction", a song by Whipping Boy from their 1995 album Heartworm
- "Fiction", a song by Nik Kershaw from his 1999 album 15 Minutes
- "Fiction", a song by Kids in the Way
- "Fiction", a song by Belle and Sebastian from their 2002 album Storytelling
- "Fiction" (Avenged Sevenfold song), 2010
- "Fiction", a song by Beast from their 2011 album Fiction and Fact
- "Fiction", a song by The xx from their 2012 album Coexist

=== Other arts, entertainment, and media ===
- Fiction (film), a 2006 Spanish film directed by Cesc Gay
- Fiksi. (Fiction), a 2008 Indonesian film directed by Mouly Surya
- Fiction (American magazine), an American literary magazine
- Fiction (French magazine), a French literary magazine

== Other uses ==
- Design Fiction, critical design, which takes a critical theory based approach to design
- Legal fiction, a legal term
