= Nakatajima Sand Dunes =

Sand dunes in Japan

Coordinates: 34°39′54″N 137°44′32″E

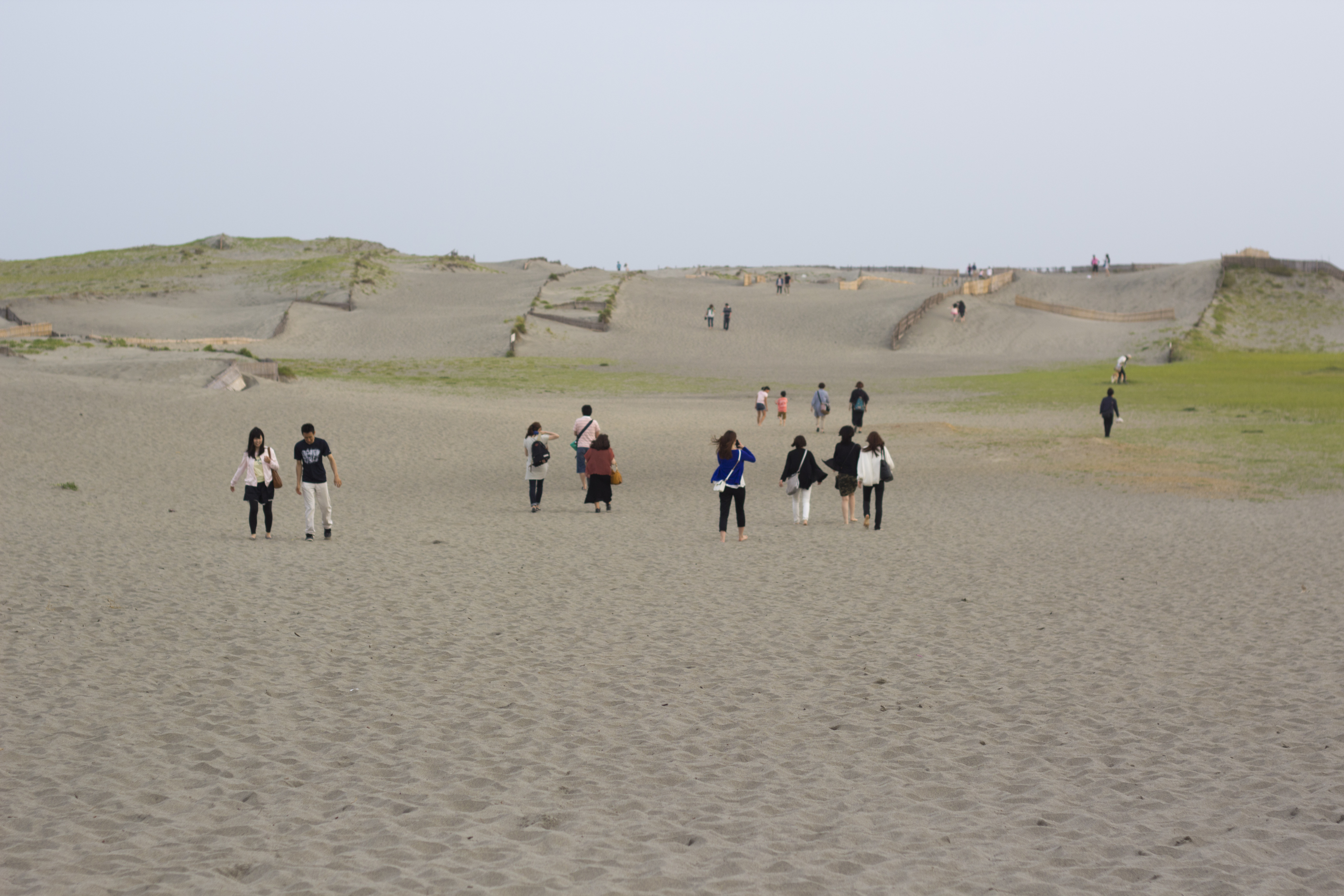
The dunes are a popular tourist attraction in Hamamatsu

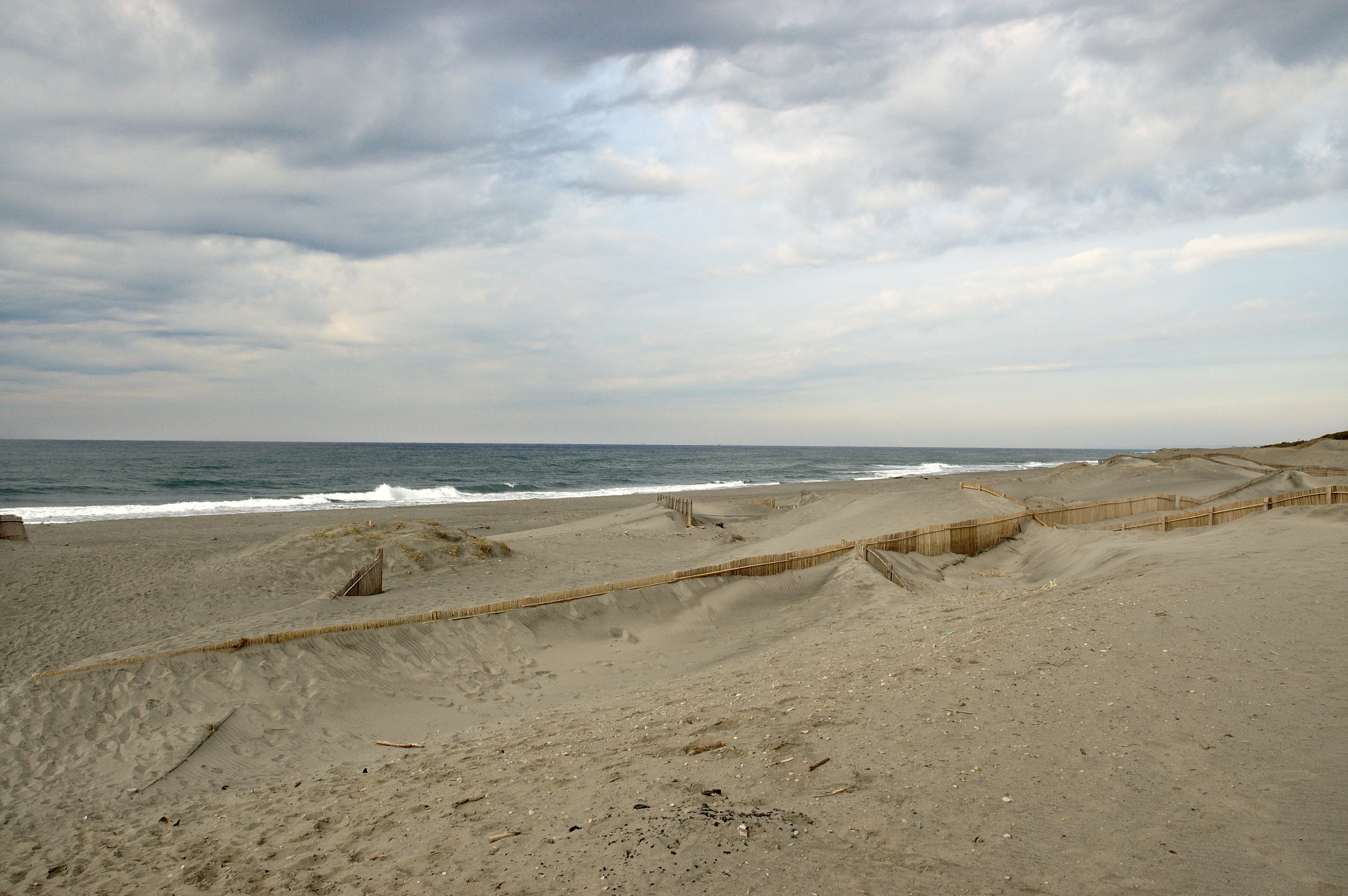
Sand dunes of Nakatajima and the Pacific Ocean

Nakatajima Sand Dunes (中田島砂丘, Nakatajima-sakyū) are located at the southern part of Hamamatsu, Shizuoka Prefecture at the Pacific Ocean coast of Japan. The sand dune area measures approximately 0.6 km from north to south and 4.0 km from east to west. It is considered one of Japan's three largest sand dune areas along with the Tottori Sand Dunes in Tottori Prefecture and Kujyūkurihama in Chiba Prefecture.

The dunes were created by sediment deposits carried from the Southern Japanese Alps by the Tenryū River into the Pacific Ocean off the coast of Hamamatsu. Sea currents and strong wind help bring the sand from the bottom up onto the shore, where the wind constantly rearranges their shape. The dunes have existed for thousands of years, but the area of the dunes has been steadily decreasing due to numerous dams built on the Tenryū River for hydroelectric power generation and irrigation. Additionally, concrete barriers erected to protect the coast from tsunami and typhoon tidal surges have disrupted the currents responsible for bringing the sand to shore. The shoreline has receded about 200 meters during the past 40 years.

In recent years, the Shizuoka prefectural government has attempted measures to stop the shrinkage of the dunes by banning the commercial extraction of sand, and (from 2003) by dumping sand offshore near the dunes, as well as employing the manual removal of encroaching grassy areas. The lasting ability for these efforts to protect the dunes is not yet known.

The Nakatajima Sand Dunes are a popular spot for locals to view the New Year's first sunrise. From May 3 till May 5, the dunes are the location for the Hamamatsu Festival, which involves flying of traditional Japanese kites.

In the summer the loggerhead turtles land on the beach to lay eggs, which are then collected to a secure area for incubation. When hatchlings hatch, they exit the secure area and head for the Pacific Ocean, where the offshore Kuroshio Current is a part of the Pacific circulatory system.

== In popular culture ==
In 2009, the music video for the song "8AM" by Japanese rock band Coldrain was filmed at the location and depicted as a desert in the video.
