= American literature (academic discipline) =

Academic discipline devoted to the study of American literature

American literature is an academic discipline devoted to the study of American literature.

== History ==
In the mid-19th century, English literature in the United States was generally seen, within academia, as inferior to classical literature and its study generally limited to secondary schools. The gradual legitimization of the English language within American academia was accompanied by the introduction of a limited number of university courses devoted to the study of American literature. The first university-level course in the subject was introduced at Princeton University in 1872 by John Seely Hart. By the 1880s, several universities offered undergraduate classes in American Literature, including Dartmouth College, Mount Holyoke College, the University of Notre Dame, and the University of Iowa. The first graduate-level course in American literature was taught at the University of Virginia in 1891.

In 1895, Dartmouth professor Charles Francis Richardson published a two-volume work on American Literature, 1607–1885, credited as the first attempt at a comprehensive history of American literature. The surge of nationalist fervor that accompanied United States involvement in World War I helped grow the study of American literature inside the United States. This was followed by an increased interest in the field abroad. By 1932, an assistant professorship of American Literature had been established at a French university while a chair for the study of "American civilization" had been created at Berlin University.

== Journals and associations ==
The scholarly journal American Literature was first published in 1929. In 1989 the American Literature Association, a coalition of 110 affiliated societies mostly concerned with the work of a particular author (e.g. the Emily Dickinson International Society or the Thoreau Society), was organized.

== See also ==
- American studies
- Studies in Classic American Literature
