= The Metallica Blacklist =

2021 tribute album to Metallica

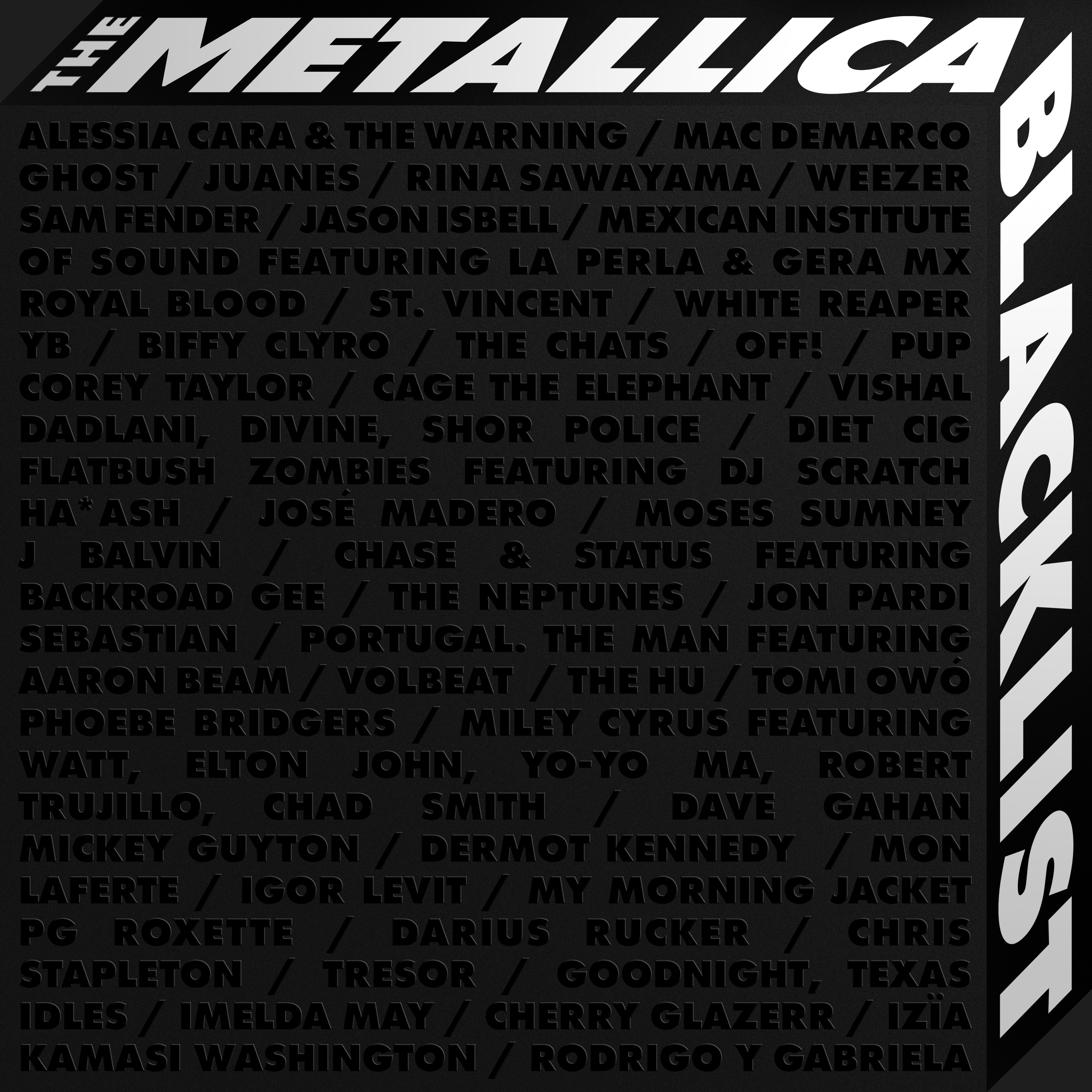

Compilation album by various artists
- Released: September 10, 2021
- Genres: Rock; heavy metal; pop metal; country; blues rock; hardcore punk; rap metal; Latin trap
- Length: 245:31
- Labels: Blackened Recordings; Universal
- Producers: Giles Martin; Metallica; Eleni Psaltas; Marc Reiter; Grant Weil

The Metallica Blacklist is a various artists tribute album featuring covers of every track from Metallica's 1991 self-titled album (commonly known as The Black Album). The collection was assembled in conjunction with the original album's 30th anniversary. Most of the songs are covered multiple times, with 53 artists participating. The album was released in digital formats on September 10, 2021, and in physical formats on October 1, 2021.

== Background ==
The Metallica Blacklist tribute album is part of a larger celebration of the 30th anniversary of The Black Album, and was released on the same day as a deluxe remastered version of the original album. The tribute album was envisioned as an illustration of how The Black Album influenced musicians from many different genres, and was inspired by the existence of several previous tributes to the album, by artists in genres ranging from electronica to classical.

In preparation for the project, Metallica invited some musicians who had gained notice for covering other Metallica songs in the past, such as the Warning, the Hu, and Rodrigo y Gabriela. Metallica then invited artists from a variety of genres to contribute unique interpretations of the songs. The invited artists were permitted to choose which song to cover. According to a statement made by the band, "The Metallica Blacklist offers up new dimensions of the record whose gravitational pull first drew the mainstream to Metallica – and provides new insights into the universal and timeless appeal that kept it there: the boundary-smashing influence these 12 songs have had on fans and musicians of all stripes."

For each song on the album, half of the proceeds are donated to Metallica's All Within My Hands Foundation, and the other half are donated to a charity of that artist's choice.

== Reception ==
Professional ratings
Aggregate scores
Source	Rating
Metacritic	66/100
Review scores
Source	Rating
AllMusic	3/5 stars
Clash	7/10
The Independent	4/5 stars
The Line of Best Fit	7/10
Metal Hammer	4/5 stars
Metal Injection	8/10
Mojo	2/5 stars
NME	3/5 stars
Pitchfork	6/10
Rolling Stone	3.5/5 stars

At Metacritic, which assigns a normalised rating out of 100 to reviews from professional publications, the album has an average score of 66 based on 10 reviews, indicating "generally favorable reviews". The album received reviews that were generally favorable toward the project's wide variety of genres and often surprising selection of contributors, but with some qualms about its repetitive or inconsistent nature as a listening experience. Metal Hammer noted that there are too many versions of some songs, especially "Enter Sandman" and "Nothing Else Matters", but concluded that the tribute album "underscores how, unlike any other band in history, Metallica have transcended heavy metal and emerged as one of music's greatest cultural exports." Metal Hammer also endeavored to rank all 53 songs on the album, concluding that the best is the version of "Nothing Else Matters" by Miley Cyrus, who was supported by Elton John, Yo-Yo Ma, Andrew Watt, Chad Smith, and current Metallica bassist Robert Trujillo.

Pitchfork also gave the album a mixed review, calling it "enormous and uneven" and criticizing some predictable covers by the hard rock and heavy metal artists, but praising genre-jumping contributions like those by Japanese-British pop singer Rina Sawayama and Ghanaian-American musician Moses Sumney. Rolling Stone made note of some of the more eclectic covers, such as the contributions from jazz musician Kamasi Washington and punk rock supergroup Off! In a separate review, Rolling Stone concluded that the album is a fitting tribute to the ongoing influence of The Black Album.

Exclaim! also noted that not all of the 53 songs are fully satisfying, but praised the project for its contributions to charity while ranking Washington's version of "My Friend of Misery" as the album's best track. Metal Injection called the album "a complete reimagining of one of the most iconic records of all time." NME called it "a fitfully thrilling hodgepodge" that forces the listener to choose their own favorite version of each song, but concluded that the album is "a fantastic tribute to one of metal's sacred texts."

== Track listing ==
Disc one
No.	Title	Writer(s)	Artist	Length
1.	"Enter Sandman"	James Hetfield, Lars Ulrich, Kirk Hammett	Alessia Cara and The Warning	4:24
2.	"Enter Sandman"	Hetfield, Ulrich, Hammett	Mac DeMarco	5:46
3.	"Enter Sandman"	Hetfield, Ulrich, Hammett	Ghost	3:51
4.	"Enter Sandman"	Hetfield, Ulrich, Hammett	Juanes	4:53
5.	"Enter Sandman"	Hetfield, Ulrich, Hammett	Rina Sawayama	5:34
6.	"Enter Sandman"	Hetfield, Ulrich, Hammett	Weezer	5:34
7.	"Sad but True" (live)	Hetfield, Ulrich	Sam Fender	3:51
8.	"Sad but True"	Hetfield, Ulrich	Jason Isbell and the 400 Unit	4:30
9.	"Sad but True"	Hetfield, Ulrich	Mexican Institute of Sound featuring La Perla and Gera MX	4:31
10.	"Sad but True"	Hetfield, Ulrich	Royal Blood	5:29
11.	"Sad but True"	Hetfield, Ulrich	St. Vincent	4:12
12.	"Sad but True"	Hetfield, Ulrich	White Reaper	5:23
13.	"Sad but True"	Hetfield, Ulrich	YB	4:03

Disc two
No.	Title	Writer(s)	Artist	Length
1.	"Holier than Thou"	Hetfield, Ulrich	Biffy Clyro	5:10
2.	"Holier than Thou"	Hetfield, Ulrich	The Chats	2:26
3.	"Holier than Thou"	Hetfield, Ulrich	Off!	3:04
4.	"Holier than Thou"	Hetfield, Ulrich	PUP	3:56
5.	"Holier than Thou"	Hetfield, Ulrich	Corey Taylor	4:11
6.	"The Unforgiven"	Hetfield, Ulrich, Hammett	Cage the Elephant	5:54
7.	"The Unforgiven"	Hetfield, Ulrich, Hammett	Vishal Dadlani, Divine, Shor Police	4:21
8.	"The Unforgiven"	Hetfield, Ulrich, Hammett	Diet Cig	4:47
9.	"The Unforgiven"	Hetfield, Ulrich, Hammett	Flatbush Zombies featuring DJ Scratch	4:37
10.	"The Unforgiven"	Hetfield, Ulrich, Hammett	Ha*Ash	4:06
11.	"The Unforgiven"	Hetfield, Ulrich, Hammett	José Madero	4:01
12.	"The Unforgiven"	Hetfield, Ulrich, Hammett	Moses Sumney	5:34

Disc three
No.	Title	Writer(s)	Artist	Length
1.	"Wherever I May Roam"	Hetfield, Ulrich	J Balvin	2:39
2.	"Wherever I May Roam"	Hetfield, Ulrich	Chase & Status featuring Backroad Gee	3:07
3.	"Wherever I May Roam"	Hetfield, Ulrich	The Neptunes	3:57
4.	"Wherever I May Roam"	Hetfield, Ulrich	Jon Pardi	6:45
5.	"Don't Tread on Else Matters"	Hetfield, Ulrich	SebastiAn	5:54
6.	"Don't Tread on Me"	Hetfield, Ulrich	Portugal. The Man featuring Aaron Beam	4:14
7.	"Don't Tread on Me"	Hetfield, Ulrich	Volbeat	3:39
8.	"Through the Never"	Hetfield, Ulrich, Hammett	The Hu	4:07
9.	"Through the Never"	Hetfield, Ulrich, Hammett	Tomi Owó	3:06
10.	"Nothing Else Matters"	Hetfield, Ulrich	Phoebe Bridgers	4:35
11.	"Nothing Else Matters"	Hetfield, Ulrich	Miley Cyrus featuring Watt, Elton John, Yo-Yo Ma, Robert Trujillo, Chad Smith	6:37
12.	"Nothing Else Matters"	Hetfield, Ulrich	Dave Gahan	5:09
13.	"Nothing Else Matters"	Hetfield, Ulrich	Mickey Guyton	4:31
14.	"Nothing Else Matters"	Hetfield, Ulrich	Dermot Kennedy	3:01
15.	"Nothing Else Matters"	Hetfield, Ulrich	Mon Laferte	5:56

Disc four
No.	Title	Writer(s)	Artist	Length
1.	"Nothing Else Matters"	Hetfield, Ulrich	Igor Levit	5:12
2.	"Nothing Else Matters"	Hetfield, Ulrich	My Morning Jacket	3:26
3.	"Nothing Else Matters"	Hetfield, Ulrich	PG Roxette	3:49
4.	"Nothing Else Matters"	Hetfield, Ulrich	Darius Rucker	6:53
5.	"Nothing Else Matters"	Hetfield, Ulrich	Chris Stapleton	8:15
6.	"Nothing Else Matters"	Hetfield, Ulrich	Tresor	6:24
7.	"Of Wolf and Man"	Hetfield, Ulrich, Hammett	Goodnight, Texas	3:24
8.	"The God That Failed"	Hetfield, Ulrich	Idles	3:56
9.	"The God That Failed"	Hetfield, Ulrich	Imelda May	4:04
10.	"My Friend of Misery"	Hetfield, Ulrich, Jason Newsted	Cherry Glazerr	3:31
11.	"My Friend of Misery"	Hetfield, Ulrich, Newsted	Izïa	4:25
12.	"My Friend of Misery"	Hetfield, Ulrich, Newsted	Kamasi Washington	6:47
13.	"The Struggle Within"	Hetfield, Ulrich	Rodrigo y Gabriela	4:00
Total length:				245:31

== Charts ==
Chart performance for The Metallica Blacklist
Chart (2021)	Peak position
Austrian Albums (Ö3 Austria)	6
Canadian Albums (Billboard)	44
Finnish Albums (Suomen virallinen lista)	17
Polish Albums (ZPAV)	19
Spain (PROMUSICAE)	77
UK Compilation Albums (Official Charts)	4
US Billboard 200	103
