= Stadio Friuli =

Football stadium

- Udinese Arena
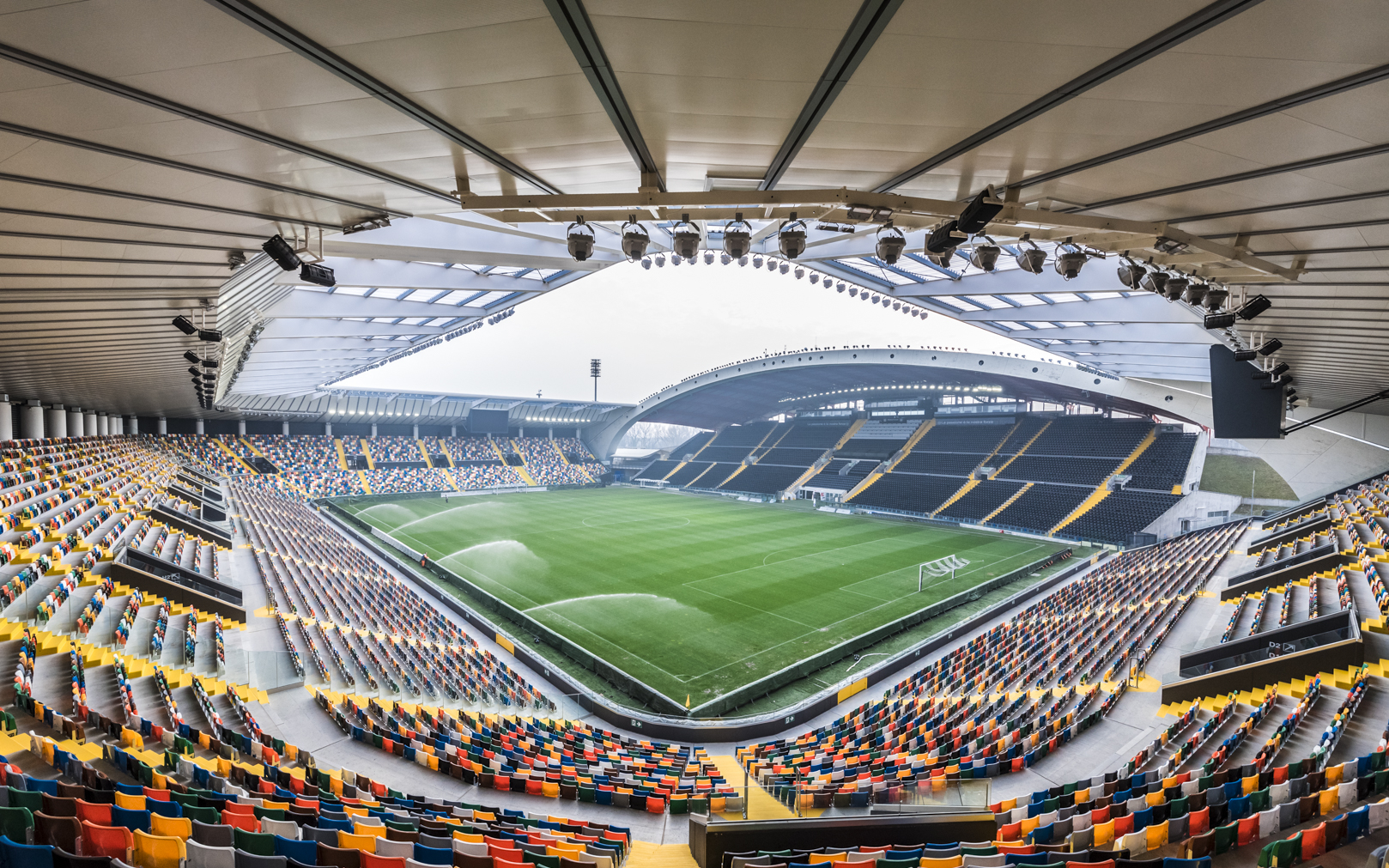
- UEFA
- Interactive map of Stadio Friuli
- Full name: Stadio Friuli
- Location: Udine, Friuli-Venezia Giulia, Italy
- Coordinates: 46.0816°N 13.2001°E
- Owner: Udinese Calcio
- Capacity: 25,144
- Surface: Desso GrassMaster
- Field size: 105 m × 68 m (344 ft × 223 ft)

Construction
- Groundbreaking: 1971
- Opened: 1976
- Renovated: 1990, 2013–2016
- Architect: Lorenzo Giacomuzzi Moore
- Structural engineer: Giuliano Parmegiani

Tenants
- Udinese Calcio (1976–present); Italy national football team (selected matches); Pordenone Calcio (2019–2020)

The Stadio Friuli, currently known as Bluenergy Stadium for sponsorship reasons, is an all-seater football stadium in Udine, Italy, and the home of Serie A club Udinese.

The stadium was built in 1976 and has a capacity of 25,144.

== Structure ==
The stadium is located in Rizzi, about 4 km from the city centre of Udine.

Opened in 1976, as a replacement for Stadio Moretti, it used to have a maximum capacity of 41,652 seats. This capacity was recently reduced to 25,144, when the stadium underwent reconstruction.

In 2013, the City of Udine granted Udinese Calcio a 99-year lease of the stadium.

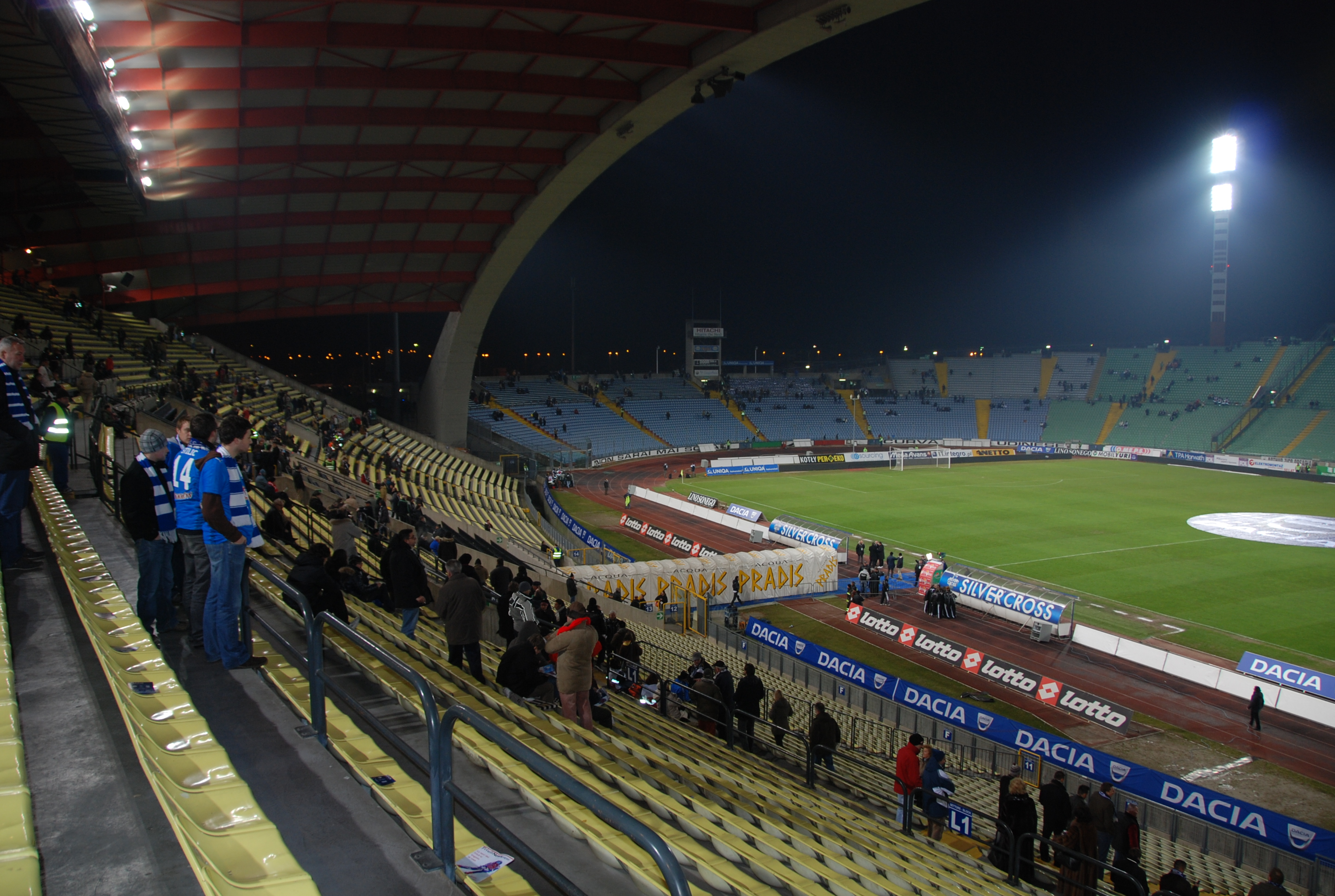
View of the stadium's previous configuration with running track and uncovered curved end stands, from the main stand (2009)

The most recent reconstruction saw the removal of the athletics track, the demolishing of three sides of the stadium with only the "arc" / West stand preserved and the three demolished stands rebuilt closer to the pitch. The cost of the redevelopment was around €50m and the work was completed with Udinese not having to move any of their home games to other stadia. The work on the new stadium officially began on 5 June 2013. During the summer of 2013, the athletics track was dismantled. On 23 June 2014, the foundation stone was laid by Udinese Calcio president Giampaolo Pozzo. The new Friuli was officially opened on 17 January 2016 when Udinese hosted Juventus. The sponsorship name of the stadium, Dacia Arena, was unveiled that day therefore the club entered into a new stadium-naming rights agreement with its parent company, Dacia.

== Important events ==
=== Sports ===
In 1990, the stadium hosted three 1990 FIFA World Cup matches, all of which were from Group E.

In 2005, the stadium was approved by UEFA to host UEFA Champions League matches, which Udinese participated in during the 2005–06 season.

On 10 September 2008, the stadium hosted the second match of the Italian national team's 2010 FIFA World Cup qualifier against Georgia.

On 21 November 2009, the Italy national rugby team played the 2007 Rugby World Cup champions South Africa on this ground.

On 13 August 2025, the stadium hosted the 2025 UEFA Super Cup.

=== Music ===
On 13 September 1988, Deep Purple played at the stadium.

On 15 September 1994, Pink Floyd played at the stadium during their The Division Bell Tour.

On 28 June 2007, Red Hot Chili Peppers played at the stadium during their Stadium Arcadium World Tour.

On 23 July 2009, Bruce Springsteen played at the stadium during his Working on a Dream Tour.

On 29 August 2009, Coldplay played at the stadium during their Viva la Vida Tour.

On 16 July 2009, Madonna played at the stadium during her Sticky & Sweet Tour.

On 19 May 2010, AC/DC played at the stadium during their Black Ice World Tour.

On 27 July 2011, Bon Jovi played at the stadium during their Bon Jovi Live tour.

On 13 May 2012, Metallica played at the stadium during their 2012 European Black Album Tour.

=== Religious ===
On 3 May 1992, the stadium hosted the holy mass presided by Pope John Paul II, who in front of 30,000 people said in Friulian:

Fradis Furlàns, us invidi a tigní dur.

— Pope John Paul II, 3 May 1992

== Notable international association football matches ==
=== 1990 FIFA World Cup ===
The stadium was one of the venues of the 1990 FIFA World Cup and held three matches.

Date	Team #1	Result	Team #2	Round
13 June 1990	Uruguay	0–0	Spain	Group E
17 June 1990	South Korea	1–3	Spain	Group E
21 June 1990	South Korea	0–1	Uruguay	Group E

=== UEFA club competition finals ===
Date	Winners	Result	Runners-up	Round
13 August 2025	(France) Paris Saint-Germain	2–2 (4–3 p)	(England) Tottenham Hotspur	2025 UEFA Super Cup

== Awards ==
The Friuli was nominated by StadiumDB.com as one of the best stadiums of the year 2016, reaching the 13th position of the Public Vote ranking and the 7th position of the Jury Vote ranking.

The Friuli received the Most Valuable Field award during the Serie A Awards in 2022.

Preceded by Kazimierz Górski National Stadium; Warsaw	UEFA Super Cup; Match venue 2025	Succeeded by Red Bull Arena; Salzburg
