= The God That Failed (song) =

Song by Metallica

from the album Metallica
- Released: August 12, 1991
- Recorded: October 1990 – June 1991
- Studio: One on One (Los Angeles)
- Genre: Groove metal; heavy metal
- Length: 5:05
- Label: Elektra
- Composers: James Hetfield; Lars Ulrich
- Lyricist: James Hetfield
- Producers: Bob Rock; James Hetfield; Lars Ulrich

"The God That Failed" is a song by American heavy metal band Metallica from their 1991 self-titled album (often called "the Black Album"). The song was never released as a single, but was the first of the album's songs to be heard by the public. It is one of Metallica's first original releases to be tuned a half step down.

== Composition and recording ==
Composer and lyricist James Hetfield described the song as "very nice... Slow, heavy and ugly." Lead guitarist Kirk Hammett recalls the inception of his solo in the song: "I had this whole thing worked out, but it didn't fit because the lead was too bluesy for the song, which is characterized by real heavy riffing and chording." According to Hammett, he and producer Bob Rock worked out his guitar solo on the song. Together they composed a melody to which Hammett wanted to add harmony. The producer suggested that this would make the song sound too "pretty", and instead recommended playing the melody an octave higher. The final guitar solo was put together from over a dozen performances by the guitarist during the recording of the album. Hammett calls the resulting work one of his favorite solos on the album.

== Meaning ==
The central theme of the song is the Christian Science faith and human reliance on it, and of unrewarded belief in a God that fails to heal. The lyrics and song material were inspired by Hetfield's anguish on the circumstances surrounding his mother's death. She died of cancer after refusing medical attention, solely relying on her belief in God to heal her. Hetfield felt that had she not followed her Christian Science beliefs, she could have survived.

Baylor University Assistant Professor of Religion, Paul Martens points out that the song has been admired by some anti-religious groups, such as the websites "Alabama Atheist" and "The Secular Web". Martens notes, however, that Hetfield does not celebrate God's failure in the song, but instead blames God, through his mother's faith and death, for contributing to the meaninglessness of life.

== Covers ==
- In 2010, Finntroll covered this song and it's included on the limited edition of Nifelvind.
- In 2012, Black Spiders covered this song for the Kerrang! album Kerrang! Presents Metallica The Black Album Covered.
- In 2021, Idles and Imelda May covered this song for The Metallica Blacklist

== Personnel ==
- James Hetfield - rhythm guitar, vocals
- Kirk Hammett - lead guitar
- Jason Newsted - bass
- Lars Ulrich - drums, percussion

== Live performance ==
The song was first played on the first date of the Shit Hits the Sheds Tour (May 30, 1994). It was played in E flat tuning from 1994 to 2011 - since 2012, the song has been played in D standard tuning. It was played frequently during the 2012 European Black Album Tour as a part of the Black Album.
