= Shit Hits the Sheds Tour =

1994 concert tour by Metallica

Shit Hits the Sheds
- Tour by Metallica
- Location: North America
- Associated album: Live Shit: Binge & Purge; Metallica
- Start date: May 30, 1994
- End date: August 21, 1994
- Legs: 1
- No. of shows: 51

Metallica concert chronology
- Nowhere Else to Roam (1993); Shit Hits the Sheds (1994); Escape from the Studio '95 (1995)

The Shit Hits the Sheds was a concert tour by the American heavy metal band Metallica that took place in 1994. The band played in 51 shows in North America, including a performance at Woodstock '94, which had an attendance of over 300,000 people.

== Overview ==
This tour is also known for the debut of the song "The God That Failed", and Lars Ulrich's down-scaled drum kits. According to Ulrich's interview on guitar center in 2014, two rack toms were removed from his original drum setup, thus allowing the hi-hat cymbal and ride cymbal to be placed nearer to him and making his drum kit easier to play.

This was also the last tour that Metallica played in standard tuning before tuning down to E♭ standard due to James Hetfield's deteriorating vocals from the recent large-scale tour in support of Metallica (commonly known as the Black Album).

On the last date of the tour in Miami, the famed lead vocalist of Judas Priest, Rob Halford (who at the time was the lead vocalist for Fight), sang guest vocals on stage for a performance of "Rapid Fire" from his band's 1980 album British Steel.

=== Supporting acts ===
The supporting acts for this tour were Danzig, Suicidal Tendencies (whose bassist Robert Trujillo would join Metallica nine years later), Candlebox, and Fight.

Candlebox were a replacement for Alice in Chains, who were forced to withdraw from the tour due to lead vocalist Layne Staley's heroin addiction. The Offspring (who had just released their breakthrough album Smash) were originally invited to replace Alice in Chains, but declined due to their desire to continue playing in clubs as well as logistical issues.

Despite Alice in Chains' withdrawal from the tour, the band's guitarist, Jerry Cantrell, joined Metallica on "For Whom the Bell Tolls" during their August 9, 1994 performance in Oklahoma City, Oklahoma.

== Typical setlist ==
(Taken from the Holmdel, New Jersey Garden State Arts Center show on June 1, 1994)

1. "Breadfan" (Budgie cover)
2. "Master of Puppets"
3. "Wherever I May Roam"
4. "Harvester of Sorrow"
5. "Welcome Home (Sanitarium)"
6. "The God That Failed"
7. "Kill/Ride Medley"
  1. "Ride the Lightning"
  2. "No Remorse"
  3. "The Four Horsemen"
  4. "Phantom Lord"
  5. "Fight Fire with Fire"
  6. "Ride the Lightning"
8. "For Whom the Bell Tolls"
9. "Disposable Heroes"
10. "Seek & Destroy"
11. Guitar Solo
12. "Nothing Else Matters"
13. "Creeping Death"
14. Bass Solo
15. "Fade to Black"
16. "Whiplash"

Encore:

17. "Sad but True"
18. "One"

Encore 2:

19. "Enter Sandman"
20. "So What?" (Anti-Nowhere League cover)

== Tour dates ==
List of 1994 concerts
Date	City	Country	Venue
May 30, 1994	Corfu	United States	Darien Lake Performing Arts Center
June 1, 1994	Holmdel Township	United States	Garden State Arts Center
June 3, 1994	Quebec City	Canada	Hippodrome de Quebec
June 4, 1994	Barrie	Canada	Molson Park
June 5, 1994	Syracuse	United States	New York State Fair Grandstand
June 7, 1994	Allentown	United States	Allentown Fairgrounds Grandstand
June 8, 1994	Wantagh	United States	Jones Beach Amphitheatre
June 10, 1994	Essex Junction	United States	Champlain Valley Expo
June 11, 1994	Mansfield	United States	Great Woods Center
June 12, 1994	Swanzey	United States	Cheshire Fair Grandstand
June 14, 1994	Philadelphia	United States	Mann Music Center
June 15, 1994	Mechanicsburg	United States	Williams Grove Speedway
June 17, 1994	Middletown	United States	Orange County Fairgrounds
June 18, 1994	Cuyahoga Falls	United States	Blossom Music Center
June 19, 1994	Cincinnati	United States	Riverbend Music Center
June 21, 1994	Clarkston	United States	Pine Knob Music Theatre
June 22, 1994	Clarkston	United States	Pine Knob Music Theatre
June 24, 1994	Ionia	United States	Ionia Free Fair
June 25, 1994	Des Moines	United States	Iowa State Fairgrounds
June 26, 1994	Somerset	United States	River's Edge Park
June 28, 1994	Maryland Heights	United States	Riverport Amphitheater
June 29, 1994	Columbus	United States	Polaris Amphitheater
July 1, 1994	Milwaukee	United States	Marcus Amphitheater
July 2, 1994	Noblesville	United States	Deer Creek Music Center
July 3, 1994	Tinley Park	United States	World Music Theater
July 17, 1994	Vancouver	Canada	Thunderbird Stadium
July 19, 1994	Seattle	United States	Memorial Stadium
July 20, 1994	Portland	United States	Portland Meadows
July 22, 1994	Mountain View	United States	Shoreline Amphitheatre
July 23, 1994	Sacramento	United States	California Exposition Amphitheatre
July 24, 1994	San Bernardino	United States	Blockbuster Pavilion
July 26, 1994	Carson	United States	Velodrome Field
July 27, 1994	Phoenix	United States	Desert Sky Pavilion
July 29, 1994	Park City	United States	Park West Ski Resort
July 30, 1994	Whitney	United States	Sam Boyd Stadium
July 31, 1994	San Diego	United States	Brown Airfield
August 2, 1994	Albuquerque	United States	University Stadium
August 3, 1994	Greenwood Village	United States	Fiddler's Green Amphitheatre
August 5, 1994	Dallas	United States	Starplex Amphitheatre
August 6, 1994	Austin	United States	South Park Meadows
August 7, 1994	Baytown	United States	Houston Raceway Park
August 9, 1994	Oklahoma City	United States	Oklahoma State Fairgrounds Speedway
August 10, 1994	Bonner Springs	United States	Sandstone Amphitheater
August 12, 1994	Burgettstown	United States	Star Lake Amphitheatre
August 13, 1994	Saugerties	United States	Woodstock '94
August 14, 1994	Columbia	United States	Merriweather Post Pavilion
August 16, 1994	Charlotte	United States	Blockbuster Pavilion
August 17, 1994	Antioch	United States	Starwood Amphitheatre
August 19, 1994	Atlanta	United States	Lakewood Amphitheatre
August 20, 1994	Tampa	United States	Florida State Fairgrounds
August 21, 1994	Miami	United States	Bicentennial Park

== Personnel ==
- James Hetfield – lead vocals, rhythm guitar
- Kirk Hammett – lead guitar
- Jason Newsted – bass, backing vocals
- Lars Ulrich – drums
