= 2012 European Black Album Tour =

2012 concert tour by Metallica

European Black Album Tour
- Tour by Metallica
- Location: Europe
- Associated album: Metallica
- Start date: May 7, 2012
- End date: June 10, 2012
- Legs: 1
- No. of shows: 16

Metallica concert chronology
- 2011 Vacation Tour (2011); European Black Album Tour (2012); The Full Arsenal Tour (2012)

The 2012 European Black Album Tour (also called The Metallica Vacation Tour 2012) was a concert tour by the American heavy metal band Metallica. Metallica (1991), commonly known as The Black Album, was performed in reverse order. The band confirmed that the tour would be a celebration of the 20th anniversary of the album. The tour headlined a few European festivals.

== Support acts ==
- Gojira (Prague, Belgrade, Paris, Udine, Oslo, Werchter, Horsens, Warsaw, Helsinki)
- Machine Head (Prague, Belgrade, Udine, Warsaw, Helsinki)
- The Kills (Paris)
- Soundgarden (Werchter)
- Channel Zero (Werchter)
- Mastodon (Oslo, Werchter, Horsens)
- Ghost (Werchter, Helsinki)

== Set list ==
1. "Hit the Lights"
2. "Master of Puppets"
3. "The Shortest Straw"/"No Remorse"/"Fuel"/"Ride the Lightning"/"The Four Horsemen"
4. "For Whom the Bell Tolls"
5. "Blackened"/"Battery"/"Fight Fire with Fire"/"Hell and Back"

The Black Album

6. "The Struggle Within"
7. "My Friend of Misery"
8. "The God That Failed"
9. "Of Wolf and Man"
10. "Nothing Else Matters"
11. "Through the Never"
12. "Don't Tread On Me"
13. "Wherever I May Roam"
14. "The Unforgiven"
15. "Holier Than Thou"
16. "Sad but True"
17. "Enter Sandman"

Encore

18. "Fuel"/"Creeping Death"/"Battery"/"Blackened"/"Fight Fire with Fire"
19. "One"
20. "Seek & Destroy"

== Tour dates ==
List of 2012 concerts
Date	City	Country	Venue	Attendance	Gross
May 7	Prague	Czech Republic	Synot Tip Arena		
May 8	Belgrade	Serbia	Ušće Park		
May 10	Warsaw	Poland	Sonisphere Festival		
May 12	Saint-Denis	France	Stade de France	72,975 / 72,975	$6,431,760
May 13	Udine	Italy	Stadio Friuli		
May 23	Oslo	Norway	Valle Hovin	39,993 / 39,993	$4,604,146
May 25	Lisbon	Portugal	Rock in Rio Festival		
May 26	Madrid	Spain	Sonisphere Festival		
May 28	Werchter	Belgium	Festivalpark		
May 30	Yverdon-les-Bains	Switzerland	Sonisphere Festival		
June 1	Nuremberg	Germany	Rock im Park Festival		
June 2	Nürburgring	Germany	Rock am Ring Festival		
June 4	Helsinki	Finland	Sonisphere Festival		
June 6	Horsens	Denmark	State Prison Open Air	40,000 / 40,000	$4,331,340
June 9	Donington Park	England	Download Festival		
June 10	Nickelsdorf	Austria	Nova Rock Festival		

== Personnel ==
- James Hetfield – lead vocals, rhythm guitar, acoustic guitar
- Kirk Hammett – lead guitar, backing vocals
- Robert Trujillo – bass, backing vocals
- Lars Ulrich – drums
