= Metallica (album) =

1991 studio album by Metallica

Studio album by Metallica
- Released: August 12, 1991
- Recorded: October 6, 1990 – June 16, 1991
- Studios: One on One (Los Angeles); Little Mountain Sound (Vancouver); A&M (Los Angeles)
- Genre: Heavy metal
- Length: 62:40
- Label: Elektra
- Producers: Bob Rock; James Hetfield; Lars Ulrich

Metallica chronology
...And Justice for All (1988)	Metallica (1991)	Live Shit: Binge & Purge (1993)

Singles from Metallica
- 1. "Enter Sandman" Released: July 29, 1991; 2. "The Unforgiven" Released: October 28, 1991; 3. "Nothing Else Matters" Released: April 20, 1992; 4. "Wherever I May Roam" Released: October 19, 1992; 5. "Sad but True" Released: February 8, 1993

Metallica (commonly known as The Black Album) is the fifth studio album by the American heavy metal band Metallica. It was released on August 12, 1991, by Elektra Records. Recording sessions took place at One on One Recording Studios in Los Angeles over an eight-month span that frequently found Metallica at odds with their new producer Bob Rock. The album marked a change in the band's music from the thrash metal style of their previous four albums to a slower, heavier, and more refined sound.

Metallica promoted Metallica with a series of tours. They also released five singles to promote the album: "Enter Sandman", "The Unforgiven", "Nothing Else Matters", "Wherever I May Roam", and "Sad but True", all of which have been considered to be among the band's best-known songs. The song "Don't Tread on Me" was also issued to rock radio shortly after the album's release but did not receive a commercial single release.

Metallica received widespread critical acclaim and became the band's best-selling album. It debuted at number one in ten countries and spent four consecutive weeks at the top of the Billboard 200, making it Metallica's first album to top the album charts. With over 30 million copies sold worldwide, Metallica is one of the best-selling albums of all time, and also one of the best-selling albums in the United States since Nielsen SoundScan tracking began. The album was certified 2× Diamond by the Recording Industry Association of America (RIAA) in 2025, and has sold over twenty million copies in the United States, being the first album in the SoundScan era to do so.

The band played Metallica in reverse order during the 2012 European Black Album Tour. In 2020, the album was ranked number 235 on Rolling Stone's "The 500 Greatest Albums of All Time" list. In December 2019, Metallica became the fourth release in American history to enter the 550-week milestone on the Billboard 200. It also became the second-longest charting traditional title in history only behind The Dark Side of the Moon (1973) by Pink Floyd. The album was remastered and reissued as an expanded box set in 2021.

== Background and recording ==
At the time of Metallica's recording, the band's songs were written mainly by frontman James Hetfield and drummer Lars Ulrich, with Hetfield being the lyricist. The duo frequently composed together at Ulrich's house in Berkeley, California. Several song ideas and concepts were conceived by other members of the band, lead guitarist Kirk Hammett and bassist Jason Newsted. For instance, Newsted wrote the main riff of "My Friend of Misery", which was originally intended to be an instrumental, one of which had been included on every previous Metallica album. The songs were written in two months in mid-1990; the ideas for some of them were originated during the Damaged Justice Tour. Metallica was impressed with Bob Rock's production work on Mötley Crüe's Dr. Feelgood (1989) and decided to hire him to work on their album. Initially, the band members were not interested in having Rock producing the album as well, but changed their minds. Ulrich said, "We felt that we still had our best record in us and Bob Rock could help us make it".

Four demos for the album were recorded on August 13, 1990; "Enter Sandman", "The Unforgiven", "Nothing Else Matters" and "Wherever I May Roam". The lead single "Enter Sandman" was the first song to be written and the last to receive lyrics. On October 4, 1990, a demo of "Sad but True" was recorded. In October 1990, Metallica began recording at One on One Recording Studios in Los Angeles, California, to record the album, and also at Little Mountain Sound Studios in Vancouver, British Columbia, for about a week. Final overdubs and mixing took place over four weeks at A&M Studios in Hollywood in June & July 1991. Hetfield stated about the recording: "What we really wanted was a live feel. In the past, Lars and I constructed the rhythm parts without Kirk and Jason. This time I wanted to try playing as a band unit in the studio. It lightens things up and you get more of a vibe."

Because it was Rock's first time producing a Metallica album, he had the band make the album in different ways; he encouraged them to record songs collaboratively rather than individually. He also suggested recording tracks live and using harmonic vocals for Hetfield. Rock was expecting the production to be "easy" but had trouble working with the band, leading to frequent, engaged arguments with the band members over aspects of the album. Rock wanted Hetfield to write better lyrics and found his experience recording with Metallica disappointing: the recording experience was so stressful that Rock briefly swore never to work with the band again. The tension between band and producer was documented in A Year and a Half in the Life of Metallica and Classic Albums: Metallica – Metallica.

Since the band was perfectionist, Rock insisted they record as many takes as needed to get the feel they wanted. The most time-consuming part would be listening through the performances – roughly 20-30 takes or so – selecting the best parts, then editing down into one cohesive track. The drum parts were kept, and everything else was overdubbed afterwards, including the guitars, bass and vocals. The album cost US$1 million to produce. The troubled production coincided with Ulrich, Hammett, and Newsted divorcing their wives; Hammett said this influenced their playing because they were "trying to take those feeling of guilt and failure and channel them into the music, to get something positive out of it".

== Composition and lyrics ==
"Enter Sandman"
The main riff in "Enter Sandman" can be heard in the beginning followed by the verse and the pre-chorus. The whole song evolved from the main riff, written by guitarist Kirk Hammett.

"The Unforgiven"
"The Unforgiven" is rumored to contain a sample from "The Showdown", from the Sergio Leone film For a Few Dollars More. The lyrics deal with the struggle of an individual against the efforts of those who would oppose him.

The album was a change in Metallica's direction from the thrash metal style of the band's previous four studio albums towards a more commercial, heavy metal sound. Despite this, it still had characteristics of thrash metal. Some critics also described the album as hard rock and groove metal. The band took a simpler approach partly because the members felt the songs on ...And Justice for All were too long and complex. Hetfield said that radio airplay was not their intention, but because they felt "we had pretty much done the longer song format to death," and considered a good change doing songs with just two riffs and "only taking two minutes to get the point across". Ulrich added that the band was feeling a musical insecurity — "We felt inadequate as musicians and as songwriters. That made us go too far, around Master of Puppets and Justice, in the direction of trying to prove ourselves. 'We'll do all this weird-ass shit sideways to prove that we are capable musicians and songwriters'" – and Hetfield added he wanted to avoid getting stale: "Sitting there and worrying about whether people are going to like the album, therefore we have to write a certain kind of song — you just end up writing for someone else. Everyone's different. If everyone was the same, it would be boring as shit."

Instruments not usually used by heavy metal bands, such as the cellos in "The Unforgiven" and the orchestra in "Nothing Else Matters", were added at Rock's insistence. Rock also raised the volume of the bass guitar, which had been nearly inaudible on the previous album ...And Justice for All. Newsted said he tried to "create a real rhythm section rather than a one-dimensional sound" with his bass. Newsted credited Rock with helping him find a sound that would work without interfering with the bass drum or the guitar, which Newsted claimed had always been an issue in his experience. Ulrich said he tried to avoid the "progressive Peartian paradiddles which became boring to play live" in his drumming and used a basic sound similar to those of the Rolling Stones' Charlie Watts and AC/DC's Phil Rudd.

The lyrics of Metallica written by James Hetfield were more personal and introspective in nature than those of previous Metallica albums; Rock said Hetfield's songwriting became more confident, and that he was inspired by Bob Dylan, Bob Marley, and John Lennon. According to Chris True of AllMusic, "Enter Sandman" is about "nightmares and all that come with them". "The God That Failed" dealt with the death of Hetfield's mother from cancer and her Christian Science beliefs, which kept her from seeking medical treatment. "Nothing Else Matters" was a love song Hetfield wrote about his recent ex-girlfriend while on tour. Hetfield said the album's lyrical themes were more introspective because he wanted "lyrics that the band could stand behind – but we are four completely different individuals. So the only way to go was in."

== Packaging ==
Metallica had many discussions about the album title. The original working title was called Married to Metal as a result of Hammett, Ulrich and Newsted's divorces, but was downplayed as a "running joke", according to Ulrich. Other names considered were Five and the title of one of the songs, but eventually chose an eponym because they "wanted to keep it simple." The album's cover depicts the band's logo angled against the upper left corner and a coiled snake derived from the Gadsden flag in the bottom right corner. For the initial release, both emblems were embossed so they could barely be seen against the black background, giving Metallica the nickname "The Black Album". These emblems also appear on the back cover of the album. For later and current releases, both emblems are dark gray so they stand out more prominently. The motto of the Gadsden flag, "Don't Tread on Me", is also the title of a song on the album. A folded, pageless booklet depicts the faces of the band's members against a black background. The lyrics and liner notes are also printed on a grey background.

The cover is reminiscent of Spinal Tap's album Smell the Glove, which the band jokingly acknowledged in its documentary A Year and a Half in the Life of Metallica. Members of Spinal Tap appeared on the film and asked Metallica about it, with Lars Ulrich commenting that British rock group Status Quo was the original inspiration as that band's Hello! album cover was also black.

== Marketing and sales ==
You think one day some fucker's gonna tell you, 'You have a number one record in America,' and the whole world will ejaculate. I stood there in my hotel room, and there was this fax that said, 'You're number one.' And it was, like, 'Well, okay.' It was just another fucking fax from the office.

— Lars Ulrich, on Metallica's first number one album

"Enter Sandman" was released as Metallica's lead single on July 29, 1991; it reached number 16 on the Billboard Hot 100 singles chart and was certified Platinum by the Recording Industry Association of America (RIAA). The follow-up single, "Don't Tread on Me", was released promotionally but did not chart. The subsequent single, "The Unforgiven", was a Top 40 hit; it peaked in the Top 10 in Australia.

Metallica was released on August 12, 1991, and was the band's first album to debut at number one on the Billboard 200, selling 598,000 copies in its first week. It was certified platinum in two weeks and spent four consecutive weeks atop the Billboard 200. Meanwhile, more singles were released to further success. "Nothing Else Matters" reached number six in the United Kingdom and Ireland, and "Wherever I May Roam" peaked at number two on the Hot Mainstream Rock Tracks singles chart, although the 1993 single "Sad but True" charted only for one week on the Billboard Hot 100 at 98. Almost all singles were accompanied by music videos; the Wayne Isham-directed "Enter Sandman" promotional film won an MTV Video Music Award for Best Rock Video at the 1992 MTV Video Music Awards.

Internationally, Metallica was also a success. It debuted at number one on the UK Albums Chart and was certified 2× platinum by the British Phonographic Industry (BPI) for selling 600,000 copies in the UK. Metallica topped the charts in Australia, Canada, Germany, New Zealand, Norway, the Netherlands, Sweden, and Switzerland. It also reached the top five in Austria, Finland, and Japan, as well as the top 10 in Spain. The album failed to reach the top 20 in Ireland, having peaked at number 27. The Australian Recording Industry Association (ARIA) certified the album 12× platinum. It received diamond plaques from the Canadian Recording Industry Association (CRIA) and the Recorded Music NZ (RMNZ) for shipping a million and 150,000 copies, respectively.

Logging over 488 weeks on the US Billboard 200, Metallica proved the third-longest charting album in the Nielsen SoundScan era, behind Pink Floyd's The Dark Side of the Moon and Carole King's Tapestry. In 2009, it surpassed Shania Twain's Come On Over as the best-selling album of the SoundScan era. It became the first album in the SoundScan era to pass 16 million in sales, and with 16.4 million copies sold by 2016, Metallica is the best-selling album in the United States since Nielsen SoundScan tracking began in 1991. Of that sum, 5.8 million were purchased on cassette. The album never sold fewer than 1,000 copies in a week, and moved a weekly average of 5,000 copies in 2016. Metallica was certified 2× Diamond by the Recording Industry Association of America (RIAA) in 2025 for shipping twenty million copies in the US. Metallica sold 31 million copies worldwide on physical media. All five of Metallica's singles, "Enter Sandman", "The Unforgiven", "Nothing Else Matters", "Wherever I May Roam" and "Sad but True" charted on the Billboard Hot 100.

=== Touring ===
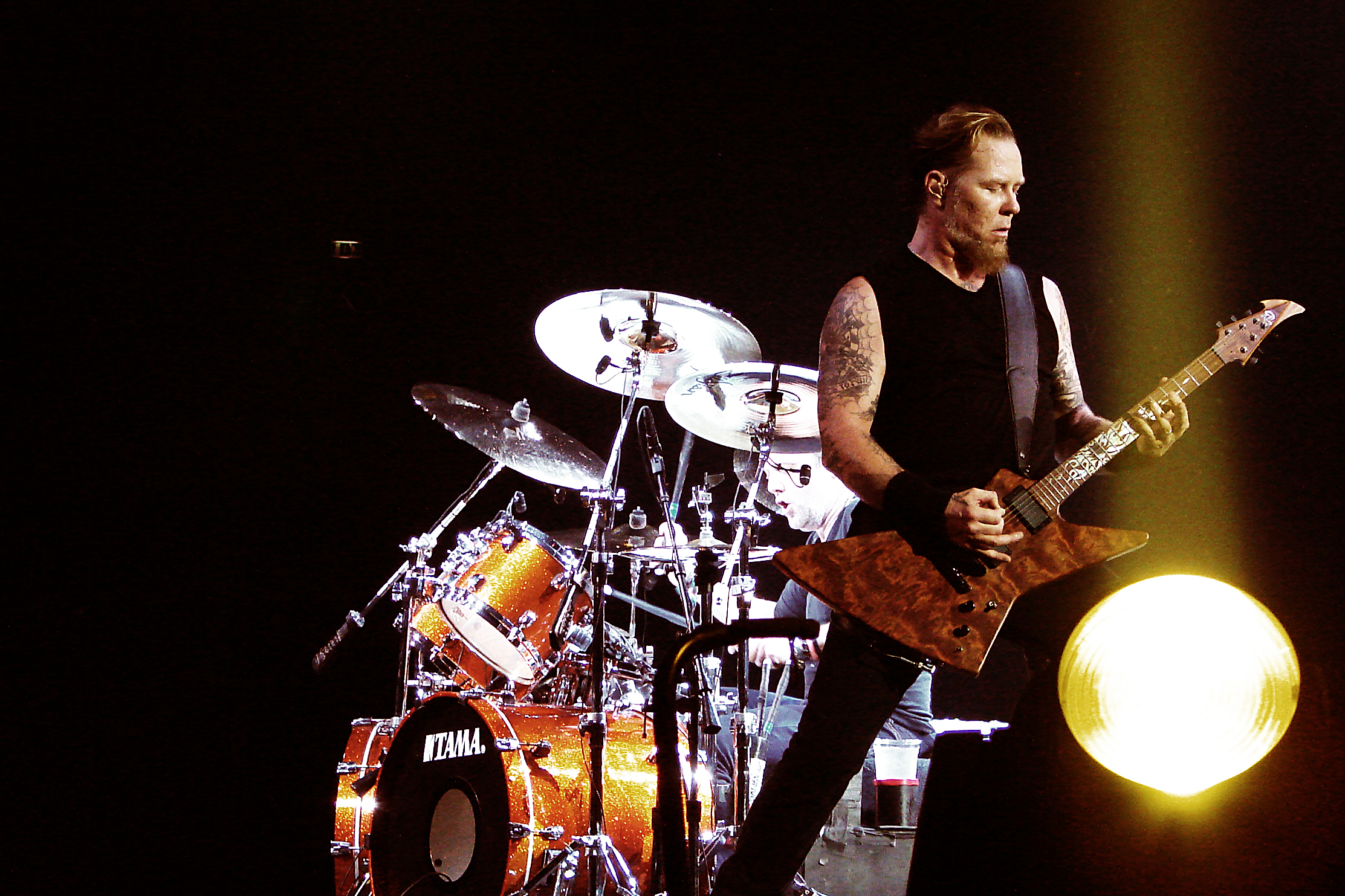
Metallica performing live "Of Wolf and Man" at O2 Arena, London in 2008

In 1991, for the fourth time, Metallica played as part of the Monsters of Rock festival tour. The last concert of the tour was held on September 28, 1991, at Tushino Airfield in Moscow; it was described as "the first free outdoor Western rock concert in Soviet history" and was attended by an estimated 150,000 to 500,000 people. Some unofficial estimates put the attendance as high as 1,600,000. The first tour directly intended to support the album, the Wherever We May Roam Tour, included a performance at the Freddie Mercury Tribute Concert, at which Metallica performed a short set list, consisting of "Enter Sandman", "Sad but True", and "Nothing Else Matters", along with Hetfield performed the Queen song "Stone Cold Crazy" with John Deacon, Brian May, and Roger Taylor of Queen and Tony Iommi of Black Sabbath. At one of the tour's first gigs the floor of the "Snake Pit", an audience area completely surrounded by the stage's triangular catwalk, collapsed. The January 13 and 14, 1992, shows in San Diego were later released in the box set Live Shit: Binge & Purge, while the tour and the album were documented in the documentary A Year and a Half in the Life of Metallica.

Metallica's Wherever We May Roam Tour also overlapped with Guns N' Roses' Use Your Illusion Tour. Hetfield suffered second and third degree burns to his arms, face, left hand, and legs on August 8, 1992, during a Montreal show in the co-headlining Guns N' Roses/Metallica Stadium Tour. The tour included pyrotechnics, which were installed on-stage. Hetfield accidentally walked into a 12-foot (3.7 m) flame shot from a pyrotechnic device during a live performance of the introduction of "Fade to Black". Metallica left the stage and later updated the crowd on James' status. Guns N' Roses then delayed taking the stage for another two hours, resulting in fans becoming restless. The Guns' frontman, Axl Rose, stormed off the stage partway through their set, sending much of the frustrated crowd into a riot. Newsted said Hetfield's skin was "bubbling like on The Toxic Avenger". The tour recommenced on August 25 in Phoenix, and although Hetfield could sing, he could not play guitar for the remainder of the tour. Guitar technician John Marshall, who had previously filled in on rhythm guitar and was then playing in Metal Church, played guitar for the recovering Hetfield. Brazilian musician Andreas Kisser from Sepultura was initially considered to join the tour, but Marshall was ultimately chosen.

The shows in Mexico City across February and March 1993 during the Nowhere Else to Roam tour were recorded, filmed and later also released as part of the band's first box set, which was released in November 1993 and titled Live Shit: Binge & Purge. The collection contained three live CDs, three home videos, and a book filled with riders and letters. Pressings of the box set since November 2002 includes two DVDs, the first one being filmed at San Diego on the Wherever We May Roam Tour, and the latter at Seattle on the Damaged Justice Tour. Binge & Purge was packaged as a cardboard box resembling that of a typical tour equipment transport box. The box set also featured a recreated copy of an access pass to the "Snakepit" part of the tour stage, as well as a cardboard drawing/airbrush stencil for the "Scary Guy" logo. The Mexico City shows were also the first time the band met future member Robert Trujillo, who was in Suicidal Tendencies at the time.

The final tour supporting the album, the Shit Hits the Sheds Tour, included a performance at Woodstock '94 that followed Nine Inch Nails and preceded Aerosmith on August 13 in front of a crowd of 350,000. Some songs, such as "Enter Sandman", "Nothing Else Matters", and "Sad but True", became permanent staples of Metallica's concert setlists during these and subsequent tours. Other songs though, such as "Holier than Thou", "The God That Failed", "Through the Never", and "The Unforgiven" were no longer included in performances after 1995 and would not be played again until the 2000s, when Metallica began performing a more extensive back catalog of songs with Robert Trujillo on bass after he joined the band upon completion of the album St. Anger.

After touring duties for the album were finished, Metallica filed a lawsuit against Elektra Records, which tried to force the record label to terminate the band's contract and give the band ownership of their master recordings. The band based its claim on a section of the California Labor Code that allows employees to be released from a personal services contract after seven years. Metallica had sold 40 million copies worldwide upon the filing of the suit. Metallica had been signed to the label for over a decade but was still operating under the terms of its original 1984 contract, which provided a relatively low 14% royalty rate. The band members said they were taking the action because they were ambivalent about Robert Morgado's refusal to give them another record deal along with Bob Krasnow, who retired from his job at the label shortly afterwards. Elektra responded by counter-suing the band, but in December 1994, Warner Music Group United States chairman Doug Morris offered Metallica a lucrative new deal in exchange for dropping the suit, which was reported to be even more generous than the earlier Krasnow deal. In January 1995, both parties settled out of court with a non-disclosure agreement. Metallica played the album in its entirety during the 2012 European Black Album Tour.

== Critical reception ==
Professional ratings
Review scores
Source	Rating
AllMusic	4.5/5 stars
Chicago Tribune	3.5/4 stars
Encyclopedia of Popular Music	4/5 stars
Entertainment Weekly	B+
Los Angeles Times	3.5/5 stars
MusicHound Rock	5/5 stars
Pitchfork	7.7/10
Q	3/5 stars
Rolling Stone	4/5 stars
Select	4/5 stars

Metallica was met with widespread acclaim from both heavy metal journalists and mainstream publications, including NME, The New York Times, and The Village Voice. In Entertainment Weekly, David Browne called it "rock's preeminent speed-metal cyclone", and said, "Metallica may have invented a new genre: progressive thrash". Q magazine's Mark Cooper said he found the album's avoidance of metal's typically clumsy metaphors and glossy production refreshing; he said, "Metallica manage to rekindle the kind of intensity that fired the likes of Black Sabbath before metal fell in love with its own cliches". Select magazine's David Cavanagh believed the album lacks artifice and is "disarmingly genuine". In his review for Spin, Alec Foege found the music's harmonies vividly performed and said that Metallica showcase their "newfound versatility" on songs such as "The Unforgiven" and "Holier than Thou". Robert Palmer, writing in Rolling Stone, said that several songs sound like "hard-rock classics" and that, apart from "Don't Tread on Me", Metallica is an "exemplary album of mature but still kickass rock & roll". In his guide to Metallica's albums up to that point, Greg Kot of the Chicago Tribune recommended the album as "a great place for Metallica neophytes to start, with its more concise songs and explosive production."

Some reviewers had reservations. Jonathan Gold, in the Los Angeles Times, said that while Metallica had embraced pop sensibilities "quite well", there was a sense the group was "no longer in love with the possibilities of its sound" on an album whose difficulty being embraced by the "metal cult" mirrored Bob Dylan going electric in the mid-1960s. More critical was Robert Christgau, who wrote in his "Consumer Guide" for The Village Voice that he "put James Hetfield out of his misery in under five plays" of the album and that he "found life getting shorter with every song". In his 2000 collection Christgau's Consumer Guide, Christgau later graded Metallica a "dud", indicating "a bad record whose details rarely merit further thought".

== Legacy ==
Retrospective appraisals have been positive. In a retrospective article, Kerrang! said Metallica is the album that "propelled [the band] out of the metal ghetto to true mainstream global rock superstardom". Melody Maker said that as a deliberate departure from the band's thrash style on ...And Justice for All, "Metallica was slower, less complicated, and probably twice as heavy as anything they'd done before". In his review for BBC Music, Sid Smith said that although staunch listeners of the band accused them of selling out, Metallica confidently departed from the style of their previous albums and transitioned "from cult metal gods to bona fide rock stars". Classic Rock called it "the absolute pinnacle of Metallica's long and successful career", and credited the album for inspiring 1990s post-grunge music and convincing the music industry to embrace heavy metal as a genre with mass appeal.

Author and philosopher Thomas Walker wrote in 2020, "Its success at encapsulating...[individualist] ideas in musical form and bringing them to a global audience is truly unique." AllMusic's Steve Huey believed the massive popularity of Metallica inspired other speed metal bands to also embrace a simpler, less progressive sound. He deemed it "a good, but not quite great, album, one whose best moments deservedly captured the heavy metal crown, but whose approach also foreshadowed a creative decline [for Metallica.]" Speaking in The Independent, Metallica biographer Paul Stenning explained that Metallica created "a sound that had not really been heard in metal before, especially by a thrash band."

Iron Maiden vocalist Bruce Dickinson said that Metallica should be given huge credit for "grabbing the opportunity when it came up, taking the risk and deservedly reaping the enormous rewards", and that their achievement with the album cannot be underestimated. He also shared his thoughts on it as well, "It's one of those seminal albums that just gets it right. It's extremely well-produced, and every note on that album is totally under control. I admire how they did it, and what they did with the songs, and it was very effective: it undoubtedly did help push metal into the mainstream."

To celebrate the 30th anniversary of Metallica, a 53-track covers album titled The Metallica Blacklist was released on September 10, 2021. The album features covers of songs from Metallica from over 50 artists in various styles. All profits from the album are donated to the band's All Within My Hands Foundation as well as charities of each contributing artist's choice.

=== Accolades ===
Metallica was voted the eighth best album of 1991 in the Pazz & Jop, an annual poll of American critics nationwide, published by The Village Voice. Melody Maker ranked it number 16 in the magazine's December 1991 list of the year's best albums. In 1992, the album won a Grammy Award for Best Metal Performance.

In 2000, it was voted number 88 in Colin Larkin's All Time Top 1000 Albums. In 2012, Rolling Stone ranked Metallica number 255 on "The 500 Greatest Albums of All Time", and then number 235 in a 2020 revised edition of the list. It was also ranked 25th on the magazine's "100 Greatest Metal Albums of All Time" (2017). Spin ranked it number 52 on the "90 Greatest Albums of the '90s" (1999), with its entry reading: "this record's diamond-tipped tuneage stripped the band's melancholy guitar excess down to melodic, radio-ready bullets and ballads".

Metallica featured in Q magazine's August 2000 list of the "Best Metal Albums of All Time"; the magazine said the album "transformed them from cult metal heroes into global superstars, bringing a little refinement to their undoubted power". In 1999, eight years after the album's release, Metallica won a Billboard Music Award for Catalog Album of the Year.

== Reissues ==
Metallica has been reissued several times, including in 2008, in 2010, and in 2014. To mark its 30th anniversary, a remastered edition was released on September 10, 2021. The album was remastered by Bob Ludwig at Gateway Mastering, with all content overseen by executive producer Greg Fidelman. A limited edition box set was released, which includes the remastered album on a 180-gram double LP and a CD, as well as three live LPs, 14 CDs and six DVDs featuring unreleased content, and various other physical merchandise. Reviewing the box set, Classic Rock magazine's Stephen Dalton gave the set four out of five stars, saying that the reissue "reinforces" Metallica as "one of rock's greatest albums". He was mixed on the work-in-progress demos and live recordings, believing that the latter became "repetitive".

== Track listing ==
All lyrics are written by James Hetfield.

No.	Title	Music	Length
1.	"Enter Sandman"	Hetfield; Lars Ulrich; Kirk Hammett	5:31
2.	"Sad but True"	Hetfield; Ulrich	5:24
3.	"Holier than Thou"	Hetfield; Ulrich	3:47
4.	"The Unforgiven"	Hetfield; Ulrich; Hammett	6:27
5.	"Wherever I May Roam"	Hetfield; Ulrich	6:44
6.	"Don't Tread on Me"	Hetfield; Ulrich	4:00
7.	"Through the Never"	Hetfield; Ulrich; Hammett	4:04
8.	"Nothing Else Matters"	Hetfield; Ulrich	6:28
9.	"Of Wolf and Man"	Hetfield; Ulrich; Hammett	4:16
10.	"The God That Failed"	Hetfield; Ulrich	5:08
11.	"My Friend of Misery"	Hetfield; Ulrich; Jason Newsted	6:49
12.	"The Struggle Within"	Hetfield; Ulrich	3:53
Total length:			62:31

Japanese edition bonus track
No.	Title	Writer(s)	Length
13.	"So What" (Anti-Nowhere League cover)	Chris Exall; Clive Blake; Nick Culmer; Djahanshah Aghssa	3:08
Total length:			65:39

Notes

- On the vinyl record releases, Tracks 1–3 were on Side A, Tracks 4–6 were on Side B, Tracks 7–9 were on Side C, and tracks 10–12 were on Side D.
- The intro to "Don't Tread on Me" interpolates the melody of "America" composed by Leonard Bernstein for the musical West Side Story.

== Personnel ==
Credits are taken from the album's liner notes, except where noted.

Metallica

- James Hetfield – vocals, rhythm guitar, lead guitar on "Nothing Else Matters"
- Lars Ulrich – drums, percussion on "The God That Failed" and "My Friend of Misery"
- Kirk Hammett – lead guitar (Note: Hammett does not appear on "Nothing Else Matters", but appears in the song's music video and performs the song live with the band, including playing the song's acoustic introduction on his own.)
- Jason Newsted – bass

Additional musicians

- Michael Kamen – orchestral arrangement on "Nothing Else Matters"
- Randy Staub – tambourine on "Nothing Else Matters"
- London Symphony Orchestra on "Nothing Else Matters"
- Uncredited musician ("Scott") – keyboard on "The Unforgiven"

Production

- Bob Rock – production
- James Hetfield – assistant production
- Lars Ulrich – assistant production
- Randy Staub – engineering
- Mike Tacci – assistant engineering
- George Marino – mastering
- Bob Ludwig – 2021 remastering

== Charts ==
=== Weekly charts ===
Weekly chart performance for Metallica
Chart (1991–2021)	Peak position
Australian Albums (ARIA)	1
Austrian Albums (Ö3 Austria)	1
Belgian Albums (Ultratop Flanders)	7
Belgian Albums (Ultratop Wallonia)	2
Canada Top Albums/CDs (RPM)	1
Czech Albums (ČNS IFPI)	43
Danish Albums (Hitlisten)	5
Dutch Albums (Album Top 100)	4
European Albums (Billboard)	2
Finnish Albums (Official Finnish Charts)	1
French Albums (SNEP)	53
German Albums (Offizielle Top 100)	1
Hungarian Albums (MAHASZ)	10
Irish Albums (IRMA)	2
Irish Albums (Official Charts)	6
Italian Albums (Musica e dischi)	2
Japanese Albums (Oricon)	3
Mexican Albums (Top 100 Mexico)	42
New Zealand Albums (RMNZ)	1
Norwegian Albums (VG-lista)	1
Polish Albums (ZPAV)	5
Portuguese Albums (AFP)	1
Scottish Albums (Official Charts)	4
South African Albums (SABC)	9
Spanish Albums (Promusicae)	5
Swedish Albums (Sverigetopplistan)	4
Swiss Albums (Schweizer Hitparade)	1
UK Albums (Official Charts)	1
UK Rock & Metal Albums (Official Charts)	1
US Billboard 200	1
US Top Rock Albums (Billboard)	1
Zimbabwean Albums	4

=== Year-end charts ===
Year-end chart performance for Metallica
Chart (1991)	Position
Australian Albums (ARIA)	28
Austrian Albums (Ö3 Austria)	40
Canadian Albums (RPM)	13
Dutch Albums (Album Top 100)	36
European (European Top 100 Albums)	26
German Albums (Offizielle Top 100)	29
New Zealand (RMNZ)	28
US Billboard 200	62

Chart (1992)	Position
Argentina Foreign Albums (CAPIF)	19
Australian Albums (ARIA)	49
Dutch Albums (Album Top 100)	18
Europe (European Top 100 Albums)	33
German Albums (Offizielle Top 100)	12
New Zealand Albums (RMNZ)	35
US Billboard 200	7

Chart (1993)	Position
Australian Albums (ARIA)	31
Dutch Albums (Album Top 100)	42
US Billboard 200	32

Chart (1994)	Position
Australian Albums (ARIA)	94
Dutch Albums (Album Top 100)	75
US Billboard 200	71

Chart (1995)	Position
US Billboard 200	94

Chart (1996)	Position
US Billboard 200	91

Chart (2000)	Position
Canadian Albums (Nielsen SoundScan)	181

Chart (2002)	Position
Canadian Metal Albums (Nielsen SoundScan)	35

Chart (2004)	Position
Swedish Albums (Sverigetopplistan)	99

Chart (2014)	Position
Swedish Albums (Sverigetopplistan)	81

Chart (2015)	Position
Swedish Albums (Sverigetopplistan)	60

Chart (2016)	Position
Swedish Albums (Sverigetopplistan)	70
US Billboard 200	92

Chart (2017)	Position
Swedish Albums (Sverigetopplistan)	72
US Billboard 200	95
US Top Rock Albums (Billboard)	16

Chart (2018)	Position
Icelandic Albums (Tónlistinn)	84
US Billboard 200	109
US Top Rock Albums (Billboard)	14

Chart (2019)	Position
Belgian Albums (Ultratop Flanders)	103
Belgian Albums (Ultratop Wallonia)	195
Icelandic Albums (Tónlistinn)	78
Swedish Albums (Sverigetopplistan)	59
US Billboard 200	174
US Top Rock Albums (Billboard)	23

Chart (2020)	Position
Belgian Albums (Ultratop Flanders)	134
Icelandic Albums (Tónlistinn)	76
Swedish Albums (Sverigetopplistan)	74
US Billboard 200	177
US Top Rock Albums (Billboard)	18

Chart (2021)	Position
Austrian Albums (Ö3 Austria)	57
Belgian Albums (Ultratop Flanders)	84
Belgian Albums (Ultratop Wallonia)	75
German Albums (Offizielle Top 100)	23
Hungarian Albums (MAHASZ)	85
Icelandic Albums (Tónlistinn)	52
Swedish Albums (Sverigetopplistan)	56
Swiss Albums (Schweizer Hitparade)	82
US Billboard 200	99
US Top Rock Albums (Billboard)	13

Chart (2022)	Position
Belgian Albums (Ultratop Flanders)	152
Icelandic Albums (Tónlistinn)	62
Swedish Albums (Sverigetopplistan)	91
US Billboard 200	102
US Top Rock Albums (Billboard)	13

Chart (2023)	Position
Belgian Albums (Ultratop Flanders)	133
Dutch Albums (Album Top 100)	93
Icelandic Albums (Tónlistinn)	76
Swedish Albums (Sverigetopplistan)	80
US Billboard 200	125
US Top Rock Albums (Billboard)	22

Chart (2024)	Position
Belgian Albums (Ultratop Flanders)	147
Croatian International Albums (HDU)	39
German Albums (Offizielle Top 100)	97
Icelandic Albums (Tónlistinn)	79
Swedish Albums (Sverigetopplistan)	79

Chart (2025)	Position
Belgian Albums (Ultratop Flanders)	156
Dutch Albums (Album Top 100)	81
German Albums (Offizielle Top 100)	66
Swedish Albums (Sverigetopplistan)	39
US Billboard 200	154

=== Decade-end charts ===
Decade-end chart performance for Metallica
Chart (1990–1999)	Position
US Billboard 200	8

== Certifications and sales ==
Certifications and sales for Metallica
Region	Certification	Certified units/sales
Argentina (CAPIF)	5× Platinum	300,000^{^}
Australia (ARIA)	13× Platinum	910,000^{‡}
Austria (IFPI Austria)	2× Platinum	100,000^{*}
Belgium (BRMA)	2× Platinum	100,000^{*}
Canada (Music Canada)	Diamond	1,000,000^{^}
Denmark (IFPI Danmark)	9× Platinum	180,000^{‡}
Finland (Musiikkituottajat)	2× Platinum	118,956
France (SNEP)	Platinum	300,000^{*}
Germany (BVMI)	4× Platinum	2,000,000^{‡}
Italy (FIMI) sales since 2009	2× Platinum	100,000^{*}
Japan (RIAJ)	Platinum	200,000^{^}
Mexico (AMPROFON)	Gold	75,000^{^} / 210,000
Netherlands (NVPI)	2× Platinum	200,000^{^}
New Zealand (RMNZ)	10× Platinum	150,000^{^}
Norway (IFPI Norway)	3× Platinum	150,000^{*}
Poland (ZPAV)	Platinum	20,000^{‡}
Portugal (AFP)	Gold	3,500^{‡}
Sweden (GLF)	Platinum	100,000^{^}
Switzerland (IFPI Switzerland)	3× Platinum	150,000^{^}
Turkey	—	300,000
United Kingdom (BPI)	3× Platinum	900,000^{‡}
United States (RIAA)	2× Diamond	20,000,000^{‡}
Summaries
Worldwide	—	30,000,000
^{*} Sales figures based on certification alone.^{^} Shipments figures based on certification alone.^{‡} Sales+streaming figures based on certification alone.

== See also ==
- List of best-selling albums in Australia
- List of best-selling albums in Finland
- List of best-selling albums in Turkey
- List of best-selling albums in the United States
- List of best-selling albums
- The Beatles (album) – an eponymous album by the Beatles also known as "the White Album" due to its packaging design

== Bibliography ==
- Clerc, Benoît (2023). Metallica All the Songs: The Story Behind Every Track. London: Cassell. p. 194, 200, 202. ISBN 978-1-78472-893-9.
