= Stade de France =

Stadium in Saint-Denis, Paris, France

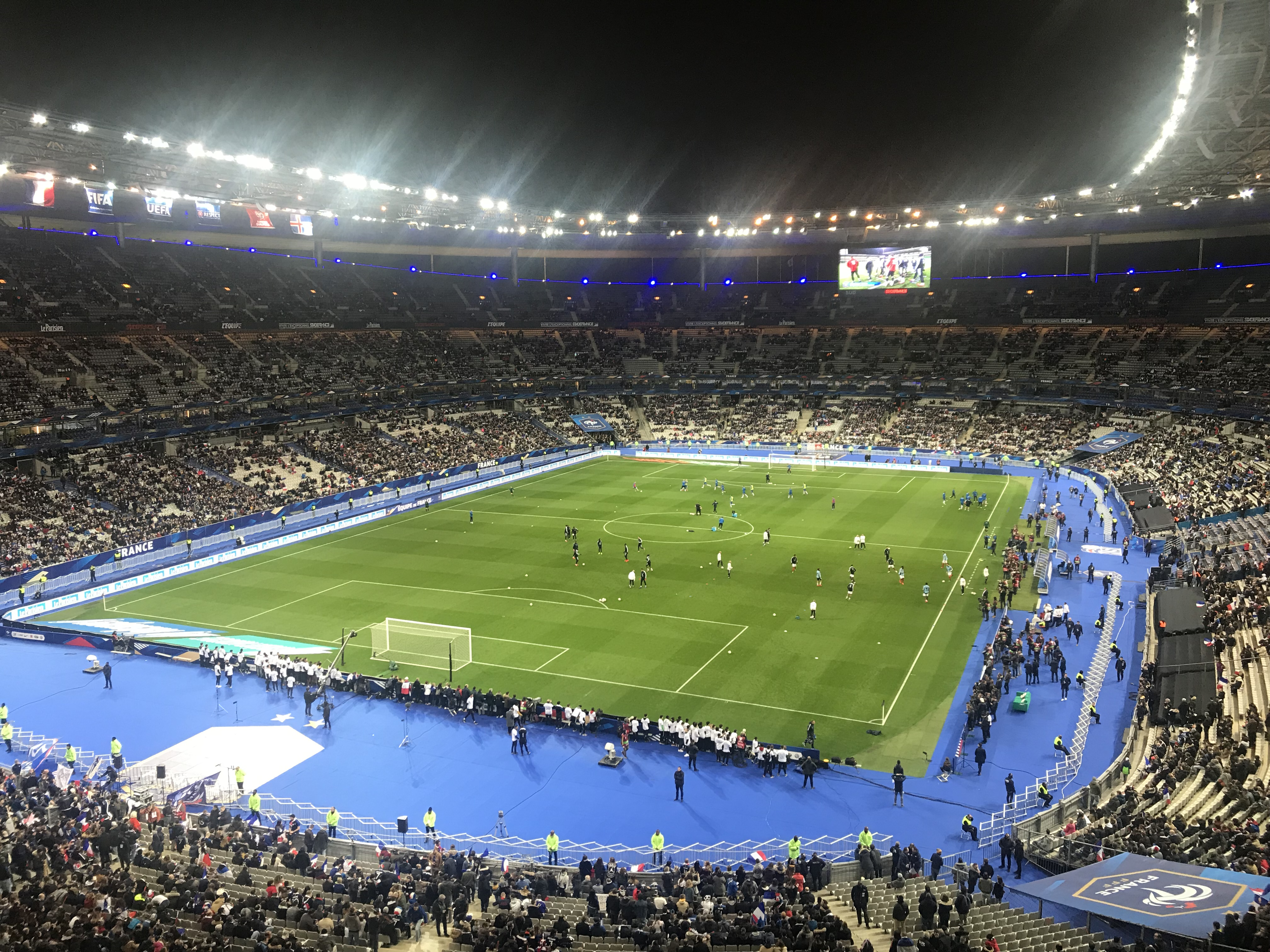
- UEFA
- Interactive map of Stade de France
- Full name: Stade de France
- Address: ZAC du Cornillon Nord
- Location: Saint-Denis, Île-de-France, France
- Coordinates: 48.9245°N 2.3602°E
- Owner: Consortium Stade de France
- Operator: Consortium Stade de France
- Capacity: 81,338 (football, rugby); 77,083 (athletics)
- Executive suites: 172
- Surface: Hybrid Grass by SIS Pitches
- Record attendance: Football: 80,056, 2009 Coupe de France final; Rugby: 80,430, 2007 Rugby World Cup final; Concert: 100,080 (Jul, May 2026)
- Field size: 119 m × 75 m (130 yd × 82 yd)
- Public transit: at Saint-Denis–Porte de Paris; at Saint-Denis–Pleyel; at La Plaine Stade de France; at Stade de France–Saint-Denis

Construction
- Groundbreaking: 2 May 1995; 31 years ago
- Built: 1995–1998
- Opened: 28 January 1998; 28 years ago
- Cost: €364 million
- Architects: Michel Macary; Aymeric Zublena; Michel Regembal; Claude Constantini

Tenants
- France national football team (1998–present); France national rugby union team (1998–present); Stade Français (selected matches); Racing 92 (selected matches)

Website
- stadefrance.com

Stade de France (French pronunciation: [stad də fʁɑ̃s], lit. 'Stadium of France') is the national stadium of France, located just north of Paris in the commune of Saint-Denis. Its seating capacity of 81,338 makes it the largest stadium in France. The stadium is used by the French national football team and rugby union teams for international competitions. It is the largest in Europe for athletics events, seating 77,083 in that configuration. During other events, the stadium's running track is mostly hidden under the grandstands.

Initially built for the 1998 FIFA World Cup and the 2008 Summer Olympics failed bid, the stadium's name was recommended by Michel Platini, head of the organizing committee. On 12 July 1998, France beat Brazil 3–0 in the 1998 FIFA World Cup final held at the stadium. The Stadium was a key player in the success of the city's bid to host the 2024 Summer Olympics and also the Paralympics and in addition to hosting athletics and the closing ceremonies of both events. The stadium was rugby sevens venue during the Olympic Games.

Stade de France, listed as a Category 4 stadium by UEFA, hosted matches at the 1998 FIFA World Cup, and the UEFA Champions League finals in 2000, 2006 and 2022. It has as well hosted the 1999, 2007 and 2023 Rugby World Cups, making it one of only two stadia in the world to have hosted both a FIFA World Cup final and a rugby union World Cup final (along with Nissan Stadium in Yokohama). It also hosted seven matches at UEFA Euro 2016, including the final, where France lost to Portugal 1–0 in a tense extra time. The facility also hosted the Race of Champions auto race in 2004, 2005, and 2006. The stadium hosted the 2003 World Championships in Athletics, and from 1999 to 2016, it hosted the annual Meeting de Paris athletics event.

Domestically, Stade de France serves as a secondary home facility of Parisian rugby clubs Stade Français and Racing 92, hosting a few of their regular-season fixtures. The stadium also hosts the main French domestic cup finals, which include the Coupe de France (both football and rugby), Coupe de France Féminine, and the Coupe Gambardella, as well as the Top 14 rugby union championship match.

== History ==
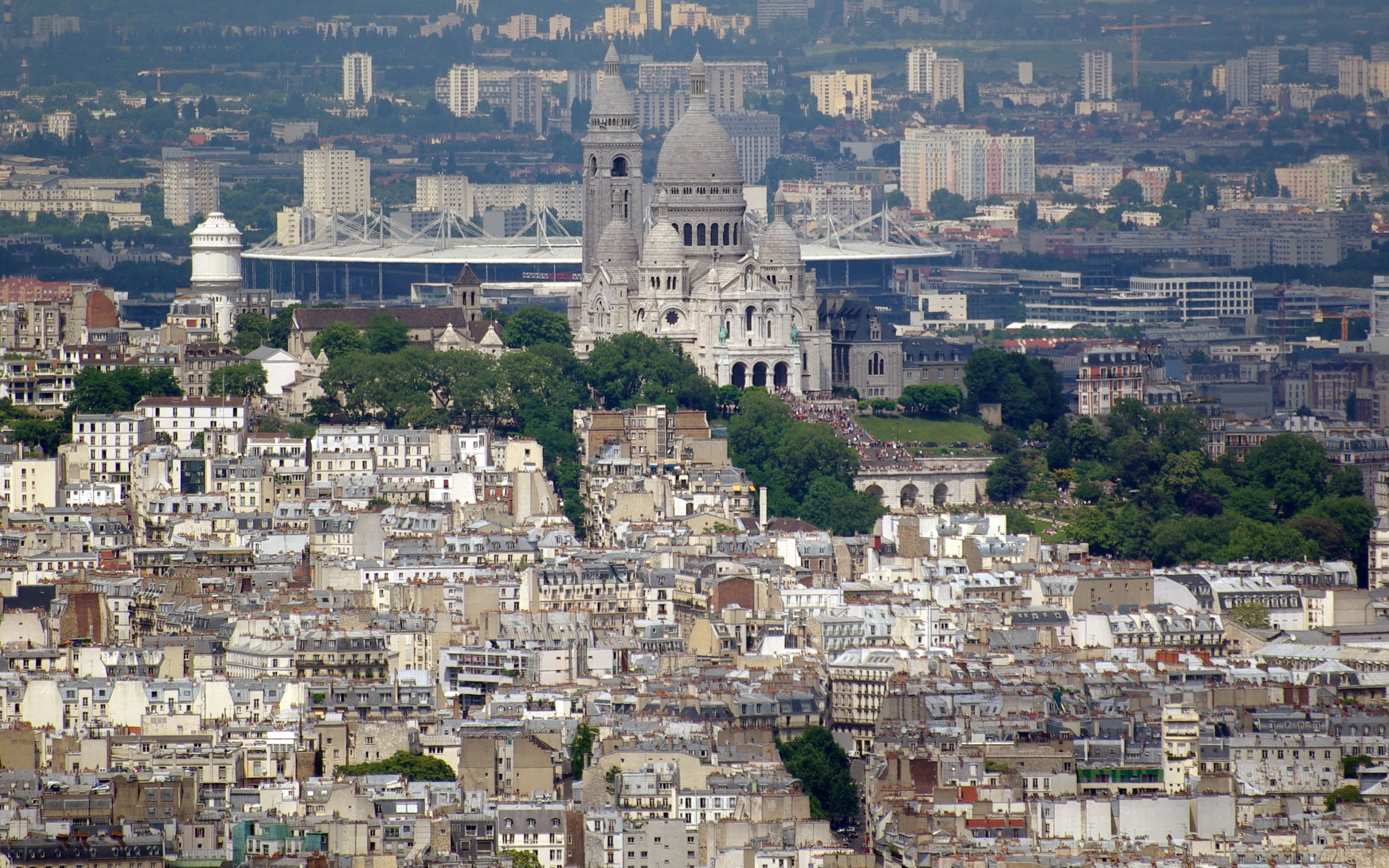
Stade de France visible from central Paris behind the basilica of Sacré-Cœur

The discussion about a new national stadium in France was asked during the bid process for the 1998 FIFA World Cup, when this issue was noted as one of the weaknesses of the Paris bid for the 1992 Summer Olympics. And despite the existing infrastructure, if the process won, there was a guarantee that the French government and the French Football Federation would build a stadium for more than 80 thousand people and that it would become the main stage of the event. With the confirmation of France's choice announced on July 2, 1992, this new all-seater covered stadium was guaranteed and thus broke the country's tradition of not building any new specific structure for a sporting event, as the last one was the Stade Olympique Yves-du-Manoir. Due to the magnitude and importance of the facility, the Council of State was allowed a first-hand approach to how the stadium would be constructed and paid for. The Council sought for the stadium to be built as close as possible to Paris and their metropolitan area, and that the constructor and operator of the facility would receive significant financial contributions for 30 months following the stadium's completion.

The stadium was officially ready for construction following the government's selection of manufacturers, Bouygues, Dumez, and SGE, and the signing of building permits on 30 April 1995. With only 31 months to complete the stadium, construction commenced on 2 May 1995. The first cornerstone was laid five months later, on 6 September. After over a year of construction, over 800,000 m^{2} (200 acres) of earthworks had been created, and as much as 180,000 m^{3} (6,400,000 cu ft) of concrete had been poured. The roof installation cost €45 million, and the mobile platform took over a year to complete.

During the developmental phase, the stadium was referred to in French as the Grand Stade ("large stadium"). On 4 December 1995, the Ministry of Sport launched a design competition to decide on a name for the stadium. The stadium was officially named Stade de France (France's Stadium) after the Ministry heard a proposal from French football legend Michel Platini, who recommended the name. The total cost of the stadium was €364 million.

The stadium was inaugurated on 28 January 1998, with a friendly football match between France and Spain. The match was played in front of 78,368 spectators, which included President Jacques Chirac, with France winning the match 1–0 with Zinedine Zidane scoring the lone goal, and the first-ever at Stade de France, in the 20th minute. Six months later, France returned to the stadium and defeated Brazil in the 1998 FIFA World Cup Final to earn their first World Cup title. Stade de France has hosted group, quarter-final, semi-final and the final match of 1998 FIFA World Cup. The national rugby team's first match in the facility was held five days after its opening, on 2 February, with France earning a 24–17 win over England in front of 77,567 spectators. Philippe Bernat-Salles converted the first ever try at the stadium, scoring it in the 11th minute of play.

On 24 May 2000, Stade de France hosted the 2000 UEFA Champions League Final. In the match, which saw 78,759 spectators attend, Spanish club Real Madrid defeated fellow Spanish club Valencia 3–0. In 2003, Stade de France was the primary site of the 2003 World Championships in Athletics. Three years later, event returned to the stadium with another Spanish club Barcelona defeating England's Arsenal 2–1. On 9 May 2009, Stade de France set the national attendance record for a sporting match played in France with 80,832 showing up to watch Guingamp upset Brittany rivals Rennes 2–1 in the 2009 Coupe de France Final. On 22 May 2010, Stade de France hosted the 2010 Heineken Cup Final. On 11 February 2012, a Six Nations international rugby game between France and Ireland had to be cancelled just before kick-off due to the pitch freezing as the stadium lacks under-soil heating.

On 13 November 2015, in one of a series of coordinated shootings and bombings across Paris, Stade de France was targeted. Two small proportion explosions occurred outside the stadium during an international friendly between France and Germany, with French President François Hollande in attendance. The terrorists, however, were unable to enter the stadium stands. The explosion was heard inside the stadium, and many thought it was a firework going off inside the stadium. The attacker wanted to infiltrate the stadium, but was scared away when he saw security and was forced to detonate outside the park. The authorities, aware of what had occurred outside the stadium, chose to continue the match out of concerns that cancelling it would have caused a panic. The stadium has since improved its counter-attack training and strengthened its security. There have since been new guidelines issued by the French police, with mixed reactions.

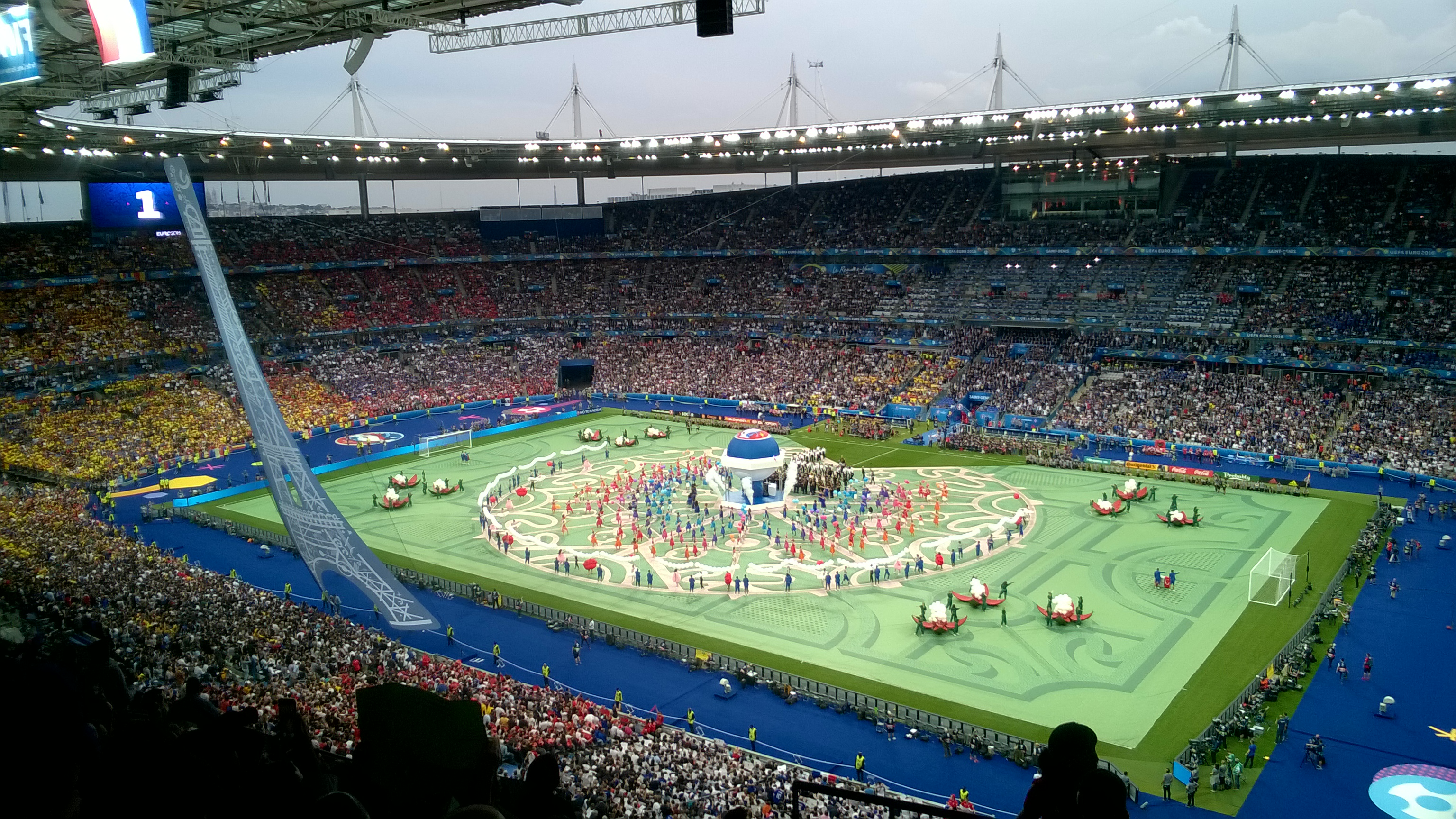
The opening ceremony of the 2016 European Football Championship

In 2016, Stade de France was used as the main stadium for the UEFA Euro 2016, hosting seven matches. The stadium was used for the opening ceremony of the tournament which saw French DJ David Guetta perform at the stadium. At the end of his set, Guetta invited Swedish singer Zara Larsson on stage to perform the tournament's official song "This One's for You". Following the ceremony the stadium was used for the tournament's opening game which saw France beat Romania 2–1. Across the next month, the stadium was used for six other tournament matches including the UEFA Euro 2016 Final between France and Portugal. The match followed the closing ceremony which again saw David Guetta perform. Portugal defeated France, 1–0 in extra time, winning the tournament for the first time.

For the third time in its history, the 2022 UEFA Champions League Final was held at the venue. This game between Liverpool F.C. and Real Madrid CF, was delayed because of difficulties admitting fans. The conclusions of the independent review, commissioned by UEFA, found that the early justification from UEFA—that the delay was due to late arriving supporters—was "objectively untrue". The review found that two overarching organisational problems were responsible: the UEFA model for such matches which allowed for an absence of overall control, and the approach to policing the match which inappropriately assumed Liverpool FC supporters posed a public order risk.

In 2026, the National Football League (NFL) will host the first regular season game in France at the venue with the New Orleans Saints as the home team and the Pittsburgh Steelers as the visiting team.

== Architecture ==
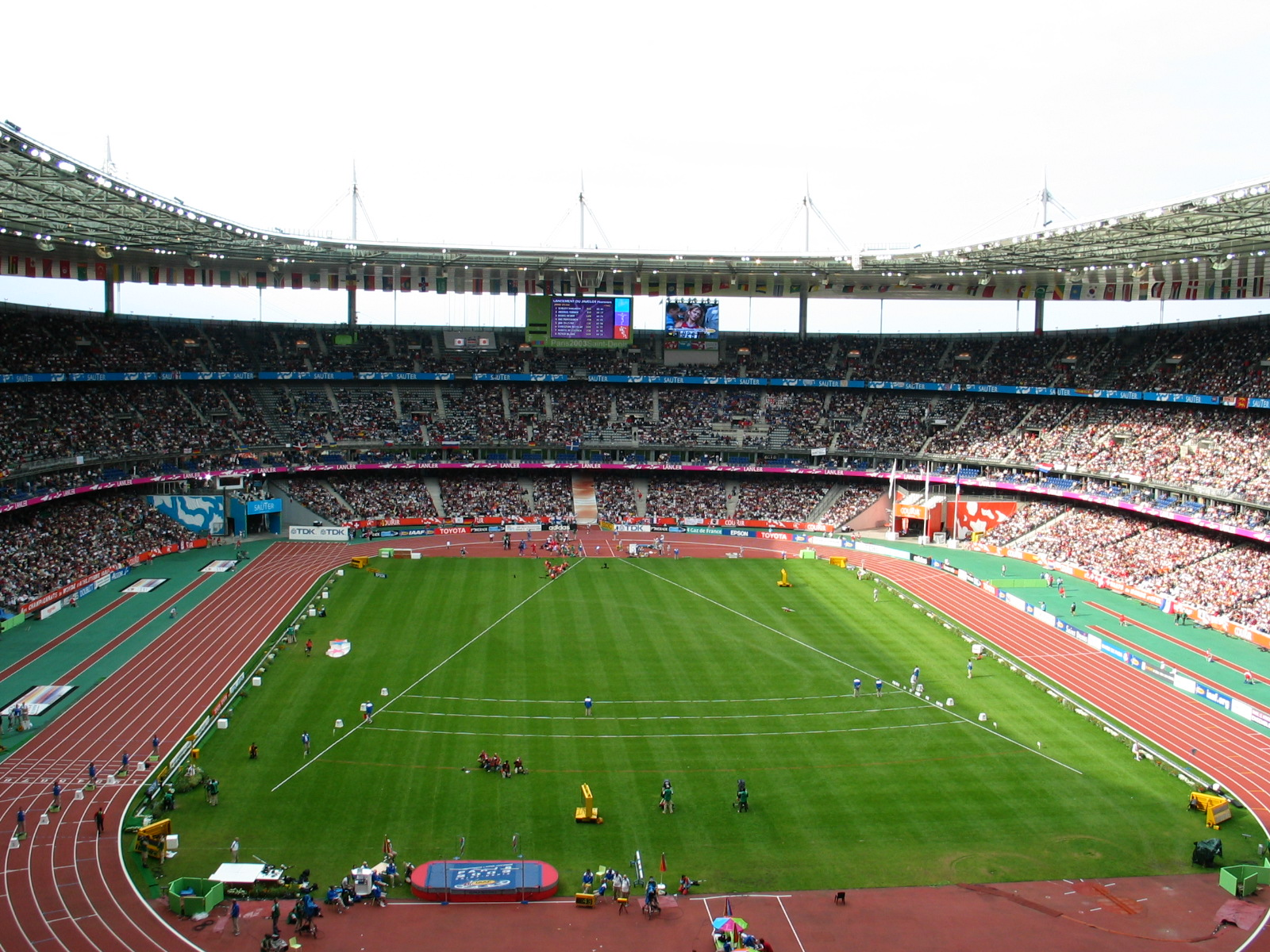
Stade de France with uncovered athletics track during the 2003 World Championships

Stade de France has a movable stand which can be retracted to uncover part of the athletics track. The stadium was notably designed with the assistance of a software simulation of crowd in order to get an accurate observation of how it would look fully developed. The facility was also intended to draw interest in and develop the area of the Plaine Saint-Denis, which straddles the communes of Saint-Denis, Aubervilliers, and Saint-Ouen. The primary goal was to renovate the area by building new residential and tertiary sites.

The stadium was built without any undersoil heating as noted when Ireland were due to play France in the Six Nations Tournament rugby union match of 2012, when the game had to be canceled.

The architecture of the Stade de France is inspired by the Worldport of the American airline Pan American at John F. Kennedy International Airport in New York. In 2002, the International Association for Bridge and Structural Engineering (IABSE) awarded a prize recognizing the unique structure of the stadium, commenting that Stade de France exhibited "a construction of an attractive open architecture of the city, with an elegance and natural lightness".

=== Roof ===
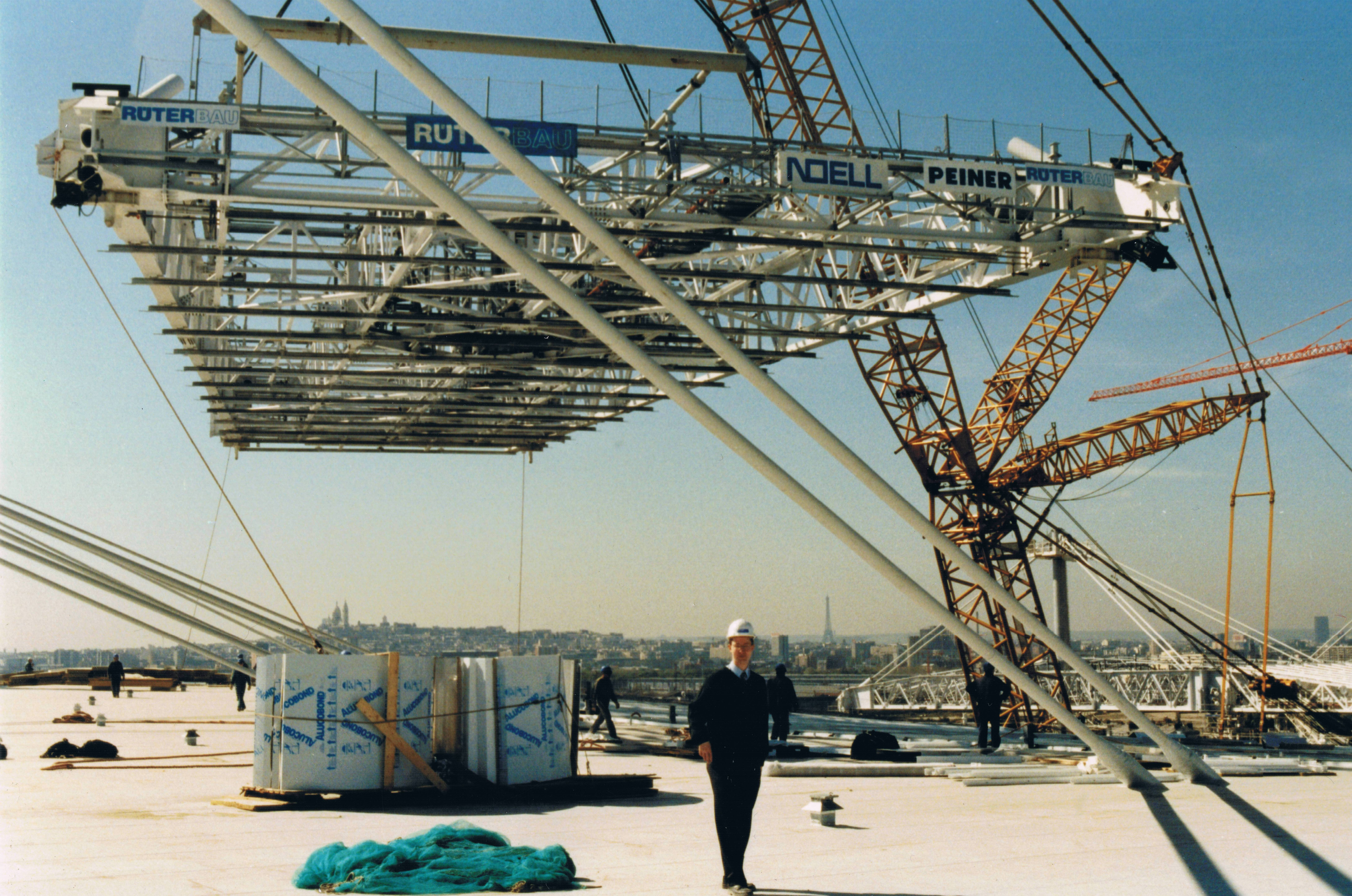
The last part of the metallic construction of the roof, 1997

Construction of the stadium's roof cost over €45 million. Its elliptical shape symbolizes the universality of sport in France. Its area of six hectares and weight, 13,000 tons, is considered a technical marvel by many. It was designed to easily protect the 80,000 spectators without covering the playing field. All lighting and sound, which include 550 lights and 36 blocks of 5 speakers, are housed inside to avoid obstructing visibility. The tinted glass in the center reduces the contrast and distributes natural light. It filters out red and infrared radiation, but lets through blue and green light, due to their necessity in the health of the turf.

== Interior ==
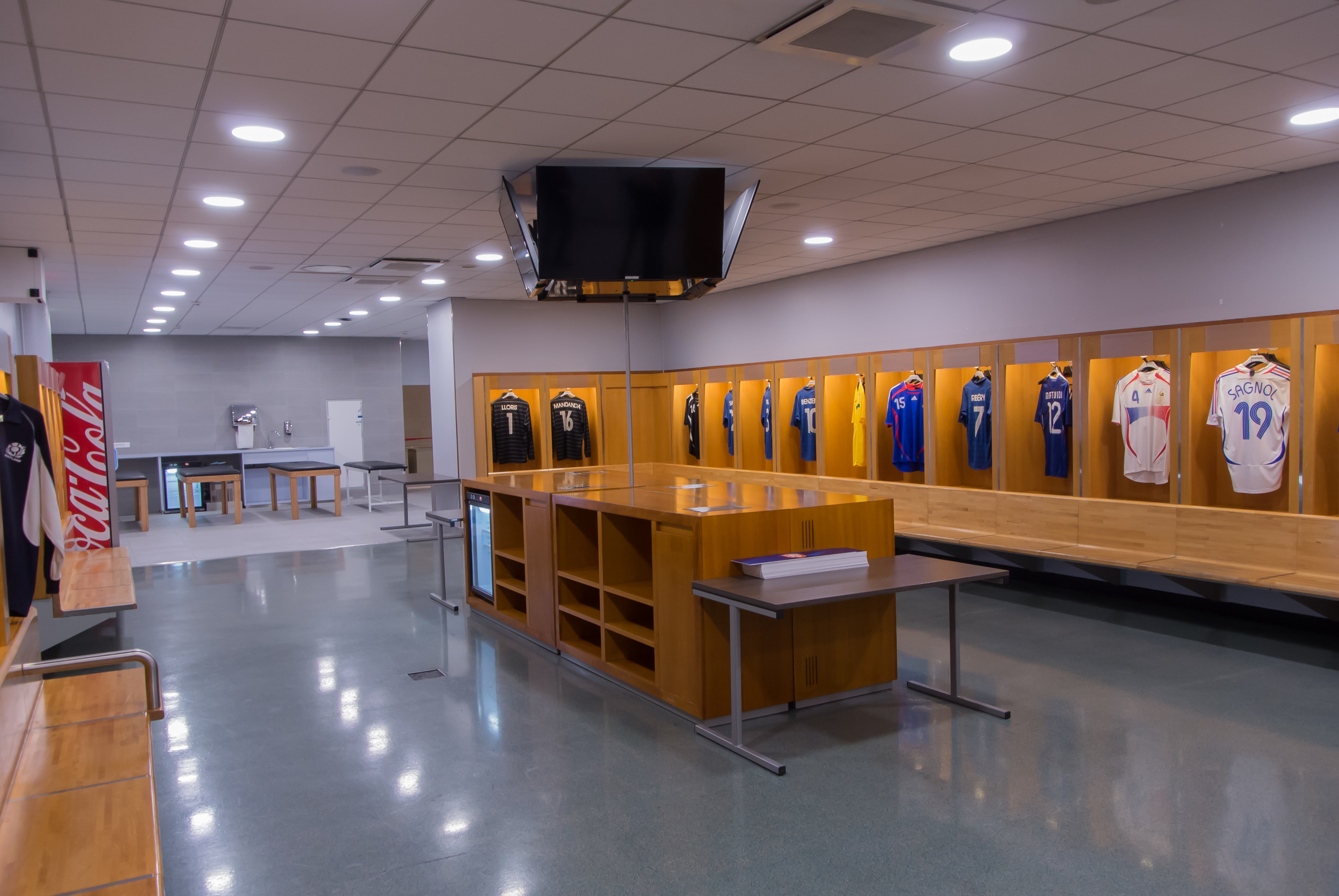
Visitors' changing room

=== Stands ===
Stade de France is the biggest modular stadium in the world. With a three modules structure, the first module has 25,000 seats. It is reached by level 1. It is partially retractable. To reveal the running track and jumping pits, the rear sections are lowered 7.1 m, then the inner sections retract 15 m into the space created, carried by ten distinct elements of 700 tons each. The tier then retains 22,000 seats. The transition takes 40 people and lasts 80 hours.

Access to the middle tier is through 22 bridges and can be found at level 3 with a concentration of restaurants, entertainment areas, shops and central station security.

Eighteen staircases lead viewers to the upper tier located at Level 6.

The evacuation procedures at the Stade de France are initiated about fifteen minutes prior to closing time. However, the actual time it takes to fully evacuate the stadium can vary depending on the number of attendees and the specific circumstances.

=== Field ===
Located at 11 meters below the court, the playing area measures 9,000 square meters (120 meters long and 75 meters wide) to a grassed area of 11,000 square meters. Nearly one billion seeds were sown to produce the first pitch in 1997. Today, the grass comes in rolls of 1.20 m x 8 m. Changing the pitch calls for three days of preparation and five days of installation. The change takes place several times a year, depending on the programming stage. Unlike many other stadiums, Stade de France was built without under pitch heating, as the stadium was constructed on the site of an old gasworks, and there were concerns it could cause an explosion.

=== Giant screens ===
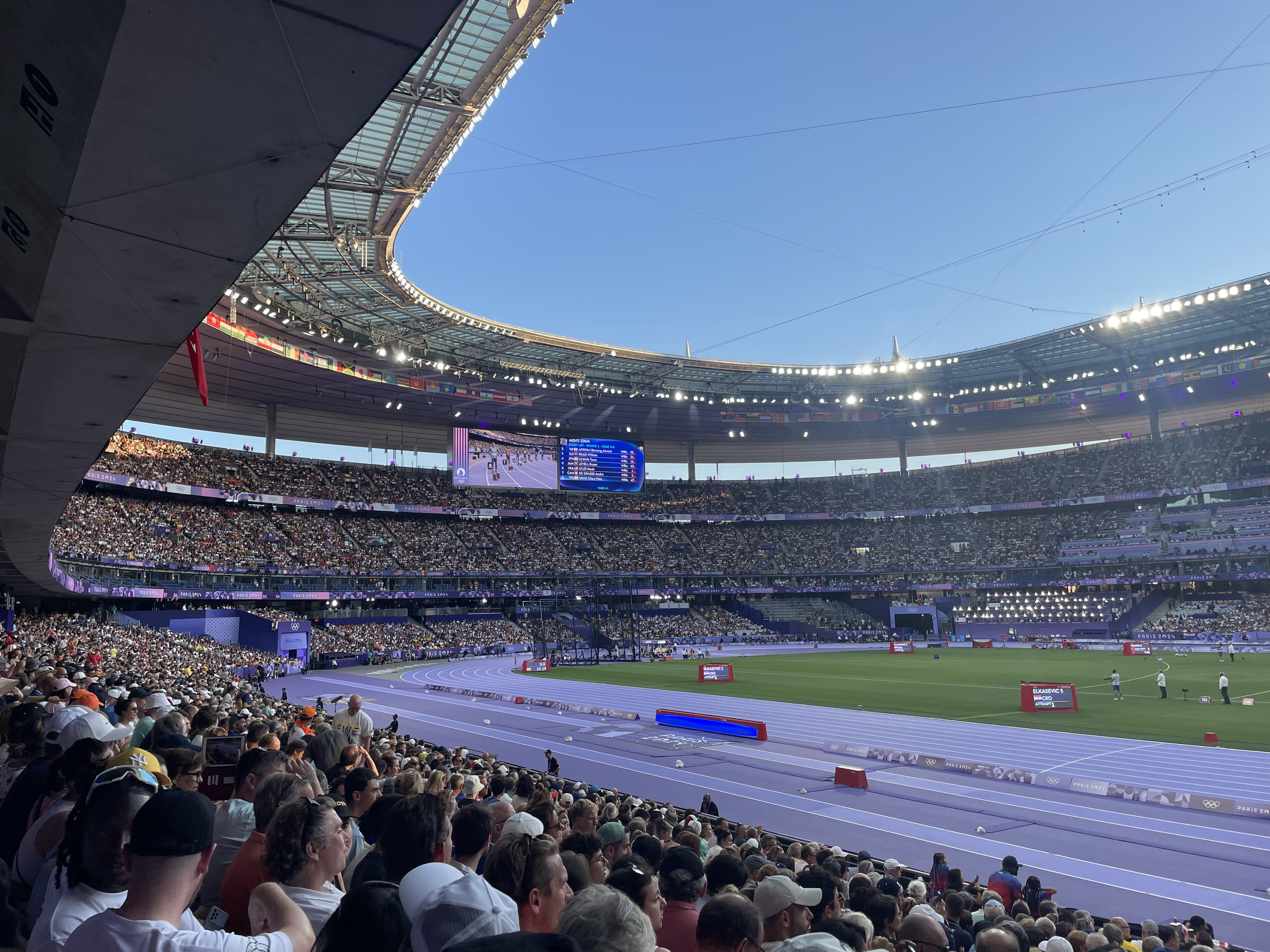
Stade de France on August 5, 2024, during the Olympic Games

As part of its policy of renewing its infrastructure, Stade de France added two new big screens in September 2006. The new displays have a surface 58% greater than the previous screens installed in 1998. The newer giant screens are each composed of 4,423,680 light emitting diodes. They have faster response time and are brighter than the previous screens.

== Major sports matches ==
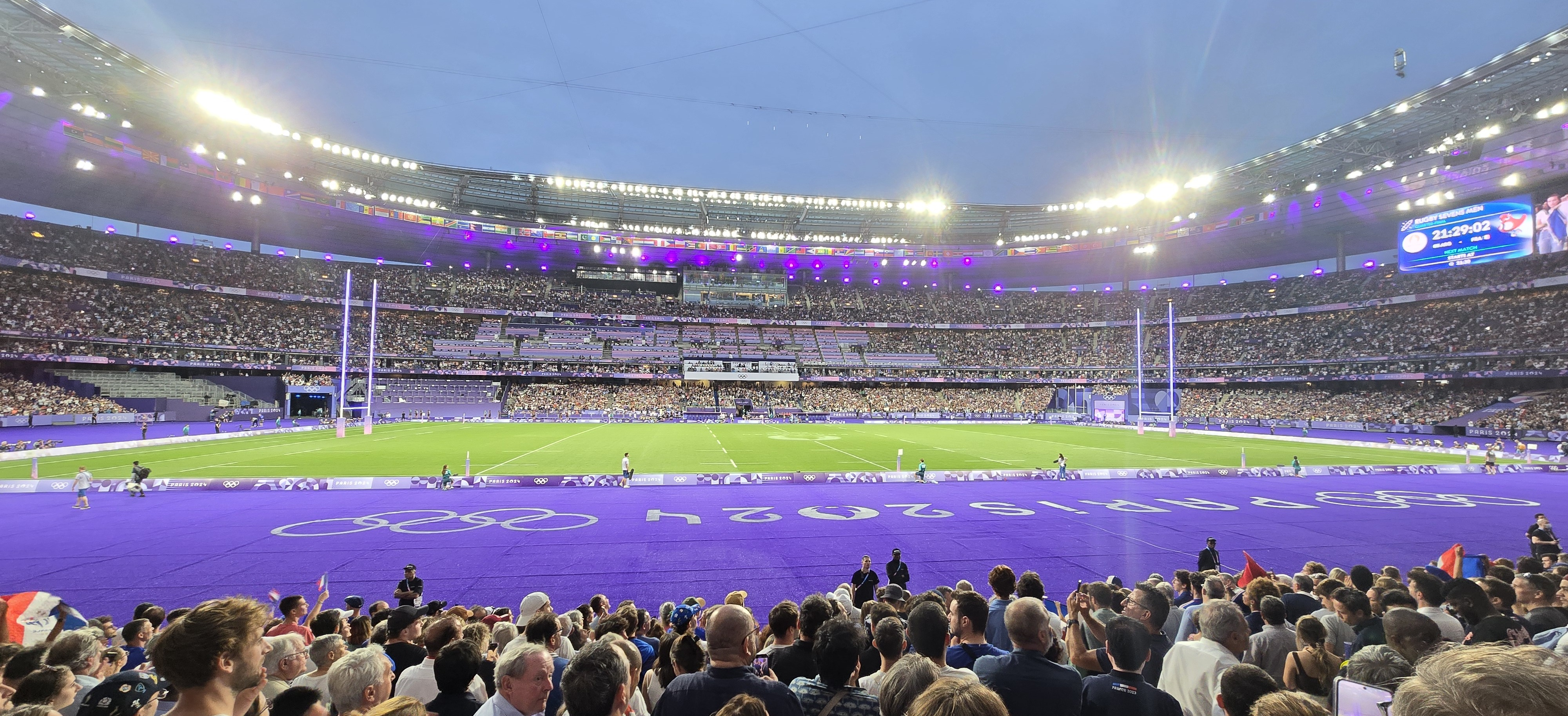
The Stade de France hosting Rugby sevens at the 2024 Summer Olympics

Sporting events held at Stade de France include matches (preliminary contests as well as finals) of the 1998 FIFA World Cup, 2003 FIFA Confederations Cup, 2007 Rugby World Cup, UEFA Euro 2016 and the 2023 Rugby World Cup. The MLB World Tour in 2025 was also planned for the venue but was ultimately cancelled. It also hosted the 2022 UEFA Champions League Final after being moved from the Gazprom Arena in Russia due to the Russian invasion of Ukraine.

The following is the list of major matches held:

=== UEFA Champions League finals ===
Date	Time (CET)	Team #1	Score	Team #2	Attendance
24 May 2000	20:45	(Spain) Real Madrid	3-0	(Spain) Valencia	80,000
17 May 2006	20:45	(Spain) Barcelona	2–1	(England) Arsenal	79,610
28 May 2022	21:36	(Spain) Real Madrid	1–0	(England) Liverpool	75,000

=== 1998 FIFA World Cup matches ===
Date	Time (CET)	Team #1	Result	Team #2	Round	Attendance
10 June 1998	17:30	Brazil	2–1	Scotland	Group A (opening match)	80,000
13 June 1998	21:00	Netherlands	0–0	Belgium	Group E	75,000
18 June 1998	21:00	France	4–0	Saudi Arabia	Group C	80,000
23 June 1998	16:00	Italy	2–1	Austria	Group B	80,000
26 June 1998	21:00	Romania	1–1	Tunisia	Group G	77,000
28 June 1998	21:00	Nigeria	1–4	Denmark	Round of 16	77,000
3 July 1998	16:30	Italy	0–0 (3–4 pen.)	France	Quarter-final	77,000
8 July 1998	21:00	France	2–1	Croatia	Semi-final	76,000
12 July 1998	21:00	Brazil	0–3	France	Final	80,000

=== 2003 FIFA Confederations Cup matches ===
Date	Time (CET)	Team #1	Result	Team #2	Round	Attendance
18 June 2003	18:00	New Zealand	0–3	Japan	Group A (opening match)	36,038
19 June 2003	21:00	Brazil	0–1	Cameroon	Group B	46,719
21 June 2003	19:00	Cameroon	1–0	Turkey	Group B	43,743
22 June 2003	21:00	France	5–0	New Zealand	Group A	36,842
26 June 2003	21:00	France	3–2	Turkey	Semi-final	41,195
29 June 2003	21:00	France	1–0 (a.e.t.)	Cameroon	Final	51,985

=== 2007 Rugby World Cup matches ===
Date	Time (CET)	Team #1	Result	Team #2	Round	Attendance
7 September 2007	21:00	France	12–17	Argentina	Pool D (opening match)	77,523
14 September 2007	21:00	England	0–36	South Africa	Pool A	79,312
21 September 2007	21:00	France	25–3	Ireland	Pool D	80,267
7 October 2007	21:00	Argentina	19–13	Scotland	Quarter-final	76,866
13 October 2007	21:00	England	14–9	France	Semi-final	80,283
14 October 2007	21:00	South Africa	37–13	Argentina	Semi-final	77,055
20 October 2007	21:00	South Africa	15–6	England	Final	80,430

=== UEFA Euro 2016 matches ===
Date	Time (CET)	Team #1	Result	Team #2	Round	Attendance
10 June 2016	21:00	France	2–1	Romania	Group A (opening match)	75,113
13 June 2016	18:00	Republic of Ireland	1–1	Sweden	Group E	73,419
16 June 2016	21:00	Germany	0–0	Poland	Group C	73,648
22 June 2016	18:00	Iceland	2–1	Austria	Group F	68,714
27 June 2016	18:00	Italy	2–0	Spain	Round of 16	76,165
3 July 2016	21:00	France	5–2	Iceland	Quarter-final	76,833
10 July 2016	21:00	Portugal	1–0 (a.e.t.)	France	Final	75,868

=== 2023 Rugby World Cup matches ===
Date	Team #1	Result	Team #2	Round	Attendance
8 September 2023	France	27–13	New Zealand	Pool A (opening match)	78,680
9 September 2023	Australia	35–15	Georgia	Pool C	75,770
23 September 2023	South Africa	8–13	Ireland	Pool B	78,542
7 October 2023	Ireland	36–14	Scotland	Pool B	78,459
14 October 2023	Ireland	24–28	New Zealand	Quarter-final	78,845
15 October 2023	France	28–29	South Africa	Quarter-final	79,486
20 October 2023	Argentina	6–44	New Zealand	Semi-final	77,653
21 October 2023	England	15–16	South Africa	Semi-final	78,098
27 October 2023	Argentina	23–26	England	Bronze final	77,674
28 October 2023	New Zealand	11–12	South Africa	Final	80,065

=== American football ===
Date	Designated visitor	Result	Designated home team	Event	Attendance
25 October 2026	Pittsbugh Steelers	16–10	New Orleans Saints	NFL International Series	78,488

== Concerts ==
Stade de France being reset after a concert in 2010

The stadium is also used for large-scale music concerts. Global acts such as The Rolling Stones, Beyoncé, Blackpink, Coldplay, Depeche Mode, Muse, Metallica, Prince, U2, Mylène Farmer, Guns N' Roses, Rihanna, AC/DC, Justin Timberlake, Céline Dion, Tina Turner, Jay-Z, Red Hot Chili Peppers, Eminem, Lady Gaga, Paul McCartney, Madonna, The Police, Rammstein and BTS have performed here.

Partial list of concerts
Date	Performer(s)	Event	Opening act(s)	Attendance	Revenue	Additional notes
25 July 1998	The Rolling Stones	Bridges to Babylon Tour	Jean-Louis Aubert	76,716	$4,406,313	First concert at the stadium
5 September 1998	Johnny Hallyday	Johnny Allume Le Feu		210,000		
6 September 1998	Johnny Hallyday	Johnny Allume Le Feu		210,000		
11 September 1998	Johnny Hallyday	Johnny Allume Le Feu		210,000		
19 June 1999	Céline Dion	Let's Talk About Love World Tour	Dany Brillant	180,102	$10,393,539	The concerts were filmed for the singer's concert film Au cœur du stade and recorded for the live album with the same name.
20 June 1999	Céline Dion	Let's Talk About Love World Tour	Dany Brillant	180,102	$10,393,539	The concerts were filmed for the singer's concert film Au cœur du stade and recorded for the live album with the same name.
5 July 2000	Tina Turner	Twenty Four Seven Tour	Joe Cocker			
22 June 2001	AC/DC	Stiff Upper Lip World Tour	The Offspring, Pure Rubbish			
21 September 2002	Kery James Psy 4 de la Rime, Ärsenik, Fonky Family, Kool Shen, Joeystarr, B.O.S.S., Oxmo Puccino	Urban Peace 1				
24 May 2003	Bruce Springsteen	The Rising Tour				
9 July 2003	The Rolling Stones	Licks Tour	Stereophonics	75,517	$6,409,958	
24 June 2004	Paul McCartney	2004 Summer Tour				
9 July 2005	U2	Vertigo Tour	Starsailor, Snow Patrol	160,349	$11,822,645	
10 July 2005	U2	Vertigo Tour	Snow Patrol, The Music	160,349	$11,822,645	
28 July 2006	The Rolling Stones	A Bigger Bang	Razorlight	62,761	$5,956,525	
16 June 2007	The Rolling Stones	A Bigger Bang	Starsailor			
22 June 2007	George Michael	25 Live		63,583	$9,473,837	
29 September 2007	The Police	The Police Reunion Tour	Fiction Plane	157,906	$15,319,076	
30 September 2007	The Police	The Police Reunion Tour	Fiction Plane	157,906	$15,319,076	
17 May 2008	Émile et Images	RFM Party 80	Lio, Jean-Pierre Mader, Rose Laurens, Sabrina Salerno, Desireless, Jeanne Mas, Partenaire Particulier, Début de Soirée, Vivien Savage, Cookie Dingler, Jean Schultheis, Philippe Cataldo, Richard Sanderson, Murray Head, Opus, Léopold Nord & Vous, Kazino, Raft			
5 July 2008	David Guetta	Unighted 2008	Tiësto, Carl Cox, Joachim Garraud, Martin Solveig			
29 August 2008	André Rieu					
20 September 2008	Madonna	Sticky & Sweet Tour	Bob Sinclar	138,163	$17,583,211	
21 September 2008	Madonna	Sticky & Sweet Tour	Bob Sinclar	138,163	$17,583,211	
4 October 2008	Rohff	Urban Peace 2	Kenza Farah, Sinik, Booba, Soprano, Psy4 de la Rime, TFL, Léa Castel, Kery James, Rim'K, Mala, Tunisiano, Sefyu			
16 May 2009	Kassav'					
12 June 2009	AC/DC	Black Ice World Tour	The Answer, Café Bertrand	74,549	$6,123,000	
27 June 2009	Depeche Mode	Tour of the Universe	M83	65,005	$5,662,502	The concert was recorded for the group's live albums project Recording the Universe.
4 July 2009	David Guetta	Unighted Energized	Armin van Buuren, Sven Vath, Axwell, Steve Angello, Cathy Guetta			
11 July 2009	U2	U2 360° Tour	Kaiser Chiefs	186,544	$20,902,760	The performance of I'll Go Crazy If I Don't Go Crazy Tonight from the concert was recorded for the group's live album From the Ground Up: Edge's Picks from U2360°.
12 July 2009	U2	U2 360° Tour	Kaiser Chiefs	186,544	$20,902,760	The performance of Angel of Harlem from the concert was recorded for the group's live album From The Ground Up: Edge's Picks from U2360°.
11 September 2009	Mylène Farmer	Mylène Farmer en tournée				The concerts were filmed and recorded for the singer's concert film and live album N°5 on Tour.
12 September 2009	Mylène Farmer	Mylène Farmer en tournée				The concerts were filmed and recorded for the singer's concert film and live album N°5 on Tour.
11 June 2010	Muse	The Resistance Tour	Editors, The Big Pink, I Am Arrows			
12 June 2010	Muse	The Resistance Tour	Kasabian, White Lies, DeVotchKa			The performance of Stockholm Syndrome was recorded for the group's live EP Summer Stadiums 2010 EP. It was also filmed and released on the band's official YouTube channel.
18 June 2010	AC/DC	Black Ice World Tour	Slash, Killing Machine			
26 June 2010	Indochine	Meteor Tour				The concert was filmed and recorded for the group's concert film and live album Putain de stade.
18 September 2010	U2	U2 360° Tour	Interpol	96,540	$10,175,248	The performance of Moment of Surrender from the concert was recorded for the group's live EP Wide Awake in Europe.
11 June 2011	Manu Dibango, Petit Pays, Fally Ipupa, Jessy Matador, Passi, Werrason, Patience Dabany, Sekouba Bambino, Mory Kanté, Alpha Blondy, Magic System, Meiway, Mokobé, Oumou Sangaré, Negro pou la vi, Coumba Gawlo, Baaba Maal	Nuit Africaine				
22 June 2011	The Black Eyed Peas	The Beginning	David Guetta			
24 June 2011	The Black Eyed Peas	The Beginning	Natalia Kills			
25 June 2011	The Black Eyed Peas	The Beginning	Natalia Kills			
30 June 2011	Prince	Welcome 2				
12 May 2012	Metallica	2012 European Black Album Tour	Gojira, The Kills	72,975	$6,431,760	Noise record (Gojira)
30 June 2012	Red Hot Chili Peppers	I'm With You World Tour	The Vaccines			The concert was recorded for the group's live albums project Red Hot Chili Peppers Official Bootlegs.
14 July 2012	Madonna	The MDNA Tour	Martin Solveig, will.i.am	62,195	$7,195,799	
2 September 2012	Coldplay	Mylo Xyloto Tour	Marina and the Diamonds, Charli XCX	77,813	$6,346,611	Part of the concert was filmed and recorded for the group's concert film and live album Live 2012. Rihanna appeared onstage for two songs.
22 September 2012	Lady Gaga	The Born This Way Ball	Lady Starlight, Rerelolewa Oyedele	70,617	$6,367,305	
8 June 2013	Rihanna	Diamonds World Tour	David Guetta, WE ARE GTA	75,841	$6,488,029	
15 June 2013	Depeche Mode	The Delta Machine Tour	Douglas McCarthy	67,103	$5,332,840	
21 June 2013	Muse	The 2nd Law World Tour	Paramore, fun.	150,936	$12,311,700	
22 June 2012	Muse	The 2nd Law World Tour	Biffy Clyro, Dizzie Rascal, Polly Money	150,936	$12,311,700	
29 June 2013	Bruce Springsteen	Wrecking Ball World Tour		61,867	$5,785,660	
22 August 2013	Eminem	The Recovery Tour	Kendrick Lamar, Earlwolf, Earl Sweatshirt, Tyler, The Creator, Slaughterhouse	71,542	$6,138,550	
21 September 2013	Roger Waters	The Wall Live		69,119	$6,853,334	
28 September 2013	Sexion d'Assaut	Urban Peace 3	IAM, Orelsan, Psy 4 de la Rime, La Fouine, Youssoupha			
26 April 2014	Justin Timberlake	The 20/20 Experience World Tour		57,286	$5,241,720	
13 June 2014	The Rolling Stones	14 On Fire		76,495	$10,042,426	
20 June 2014	One Direction	Where We Are Tour	McBusted	114,172	$9,775,550	
21 June 2014	One Direction	Where We Are Tour	McBusted	114,172	$9,775,550	
27 June 2014	Indochine	Black City Tour				Two concerts were filmed and recorded for the group's concert film and live album Black City Concerts.
28 June 2014	Indochine	Black City Tour				Two concerts were filmed and recorded for the group's concert film and live album Black City Concerts.
12 September 2014	Beyoncé Jay-Z	On the Run Tour		147,012	$13,631,722	The concerts were aired by HBO. Nicki Minaj appeared on stage for one song.
13 September 2014	Beyoncé Jay-Z	On the Run Tour		147,012	$13,631,722	The concerts were aired by HBO. Nicki Minaj appeared on stage for one song.
23 May 2015	AC/DC	Rock or Bust World Tour				
26 May 2015	AC/DC	Rock or Bust World Tour				
11 June 2015	Paul McCartney	Out There				
21 July 2016	Beyoncé	The Formation World Tour	Chloe x Halle, Ingrid	75,106	$6,258,954	
30 July 2016	Rihanna	Anti World Tour	Big Sean, DJ Mustard			
1 July 2017	Depeche Mode	Global Spirit Tour	Algiers	58,199	$4,664,546	
7 July 2017	Guns N' Roses	Not in This Lifetime... Tour	Biffy Clyro	60,438	$5,439,491	
15 July 2017	Coldplay	A Head Full of Dreams Tour	Tove Lo; Lyves	235,611	$19,884,200	The shows grossed $19.8 million in total.
16 July 2017	Coldplay	A Head Full of Dreams Tour	Tove Lo; Lyves	235,611	$19,884,200	The shows grossed $19.8 million in total.
18 July 2017	Coldplay	A Head Full of Dreams Tour	Tove Lo; Lyves	235,611	$19,884,200	The shows grossed $19.8 million in total.
25 July 2017	U2	The Joshua Tree Tour 2017	Noel Gallagher's High Flying Birds	154,486	$17,277,631	
26 July 2017	U2	The Joshua Tree Tour 2017	Noel Gallagher's High Flying Birds	154,486	$17,277,631	
15 September 2017	Les Insus	Dernier Appel				
16 September 2017	Les Insus	Dernier Appel				
30 June 2018	Bruno Mars	24K Magic World Tour	DNCE, DJ Rashida			
6 July 2018	Ed Sheeran	÷ Tour	Anne Marie, Jamie Lawson	153,065	$9,308,969	
7 July 2018	Ed Sheeran	÷ Tour		153,065	$9,308,969	
14 July 2018	Beyoncé Jay-Z	On the Run II Tour		111,615	$10,905,089	
15 July 2018	Beyoncé Jay-Z	On the Run II Tour		111,615	$10,905,089	The 2018 FIFA World Cup Final was broadcast live before the start of the concert.
12 May 2019	Metallica	WorldWired Tour	Ghost; Bokassa	74,889	$6,917,057	
7 June 2019	BTS	BTS World Tour Love Yourself: Speak Yourself		107,328	$13,728,598	The first K-Pop group to hold a concert at this venue
8 June 2019	BTS	BTS World Tour Love Yourself: Speak Yourself		107,328	$13,728,598	The first K-Pop group to hold a concert at this venue
29 June 2019	Rockin' 1000					
5 July 2019	Muse	Simulation Theory World Tour	Weezer, Mini Mansions	131,321	$12,225,296	Clips of the performances of Propaganda, Thought Contagion and Algorithm were released on the group's official YouTube channel.
6 July 2019	Muse	Simulation Theory World Tour	SWMRS, Mini Mansions	131,321	$12,225,296	Clips of the performances of Propaganda, Thought Contagion and Algorithm were released on the group's official YouTube channel.
29 November 2019	Maître Gims	Fuego Tour				
21 May 2022	Indochine	Central Tour	Coach Party			
8 July 2022	Red Hot Chili Peppers	2022 Global Stadium Tour	Anderson .Paak & the Free Nationals; Thundercat	136,512	$12,851,604	
9 July 2022	Red Hot Chili Peppers	2022 Global Stadium Tour	Anderson .Paak & the Free Nationals; Thundercat	136,512	$12,851,604	
16 July 2022	Coldplay	Music of the Spheres World Tour	H.E.R. Gaumar	318,331	$28,035,164	Coldplay hold four records at the venue, including fastest ticket sales ever in France (over 200,000 units in a morning); first act to sell over 300,000 tickets on a single tour, first act to perform four shows on a single tour; and highest attendance of all time (318,331).
17 July 2022	Coldplay	Music of the Spheres World Tour	H.E.R. Gaumar	318,331	$28,035,164	Coldplay hold four records at the venue, including fastest ticket sales ever in France (over 200,000 units in a morning); first act to sell over 300,000 tickets on a single tour, first act to perform four shows on a single tour; and highest attendance of all time (318,331).
19 July 2022	Coldplay	Music of the Spheres World Tour	London Grammar; Lous and the Yakuza	318,331	$28,035,164	Coldplay hold four records at the venue, including fastest ticket sales ever in France (over 200,000 units in a morning); first act to sell over 300,000 tickets on a single tour, first act to perform four shows on a single tour; and highest attendance of all time (318,331).
20 July 2022	Coldplay	Music of the Spheres World Tour	London Grammar; Lous and the Yakuza	318,331	$28,035,164	Coldplay hold four records at the venue, including fastest ticket sales ever in France (over 200,000 units in a morning); first act to sell over 300,000 tickets on a single tour, first act to perform four shows on a single tour; and highest attendance of all time (318,331).
24 July 2022	Lady Gaga	The Chromatica Ball		78,866	$7,844,680	
29 July 2022	Ed Sheeran	+–=÷x Tour	Maisie Peters, Griff	166,764	$10,767,404	
30 July 2022	Ed Sheeran	+–=÷x Tour	Maisie Peters, Griff	166,764	$10,767,404	
3 September 2022	Booba		SDM & Green Montana			
17 May 2023	Metallica	M72 World Tour	Five Finger Death Punch; Ice Nine Kills	96,376	$11,318,434	
19 May 2023	Metallica	M72 World Tour	Architects; Mammoth WVH	96,376	$11,318,434	
26 May 2023	Beyoncé	Renaissance World Tour		68,624	$9,402,605	
1 June 2023	Harry Styles	Love On Tour	Wet Leg	132,880	$14,079,140	
2 June 2023	Harry Styles	Love On Tour	Wet Leg	132,880	$14,079,140	
24 June 2023	Depeche Mode	Memento Mori World Tour	Jehnny Beth	70,720	$5,725,938	
8 July 2023	Muse	Will of the People World Tour	Royal Blood	70,390	$6,641,004	
15 July 2023	Blackpink	Born Pink World Tour		52,781	$9,878,963	The first K-Pop girl group to hold a concert at this venue
22 July 2023	Rammstein	Rammstein Stadium Tour		68,122	$7,235,690	
29 July 2023	The Weeknd	After Hours til Dawn Tour	Kaytranada; Mike Dean	150,610	$15,858,993	
30 July 2023	The Weeknd	After Hours til Dawn Tour	Kaytranada; Mike Dean	150,610	$15,858,993	
27 September 2024	Mylène Farmer	Nevermore 2023/2024				
28 September 2024	Mylène Farmer	Nevermore 2023/2024				
1 October 2024	Mylène Farmer	Nevermore 2023/2024				
18 April 2025	Burna Boy	Told Them...Tour				
26 April 2025	Jul					
2 May 2025	Ninho	Jefe Airlines Tour				
3 May 2025	Ninho	Jefe Airlines Tour				
10 May 2025	DJ Snake	The Final Show				
19 June 2025	Beyoncé	Cowboy Carter Tour		215,025	$39,719,132	Highest gross ever ($39.7 million). Highest average gross ($13.2 million). Highest attendance for a female act (215,025). First international female act to perform three shows on a single tour. Most career performances by a female act (9 shows).
21 June 2025	Beyoncé	Cowboy Carter Tour		215,025	$39,719,132	Highest gross ever ($39.7 million). Highest average gross ($13.2 million). Highest attendance for a female act (215,025). First international female act to perform three shows on a single tour. Most career performances by a female act (9 shows).
22 June 2025	Beyoncé	Cowboy Carter Tour		215,025	$39,719,132	Highest gross ever ($39.7 million). Highest average gross ($13.2 million). Highest attendance for a female act (215,025). First international female act to perform three shows on a single tour. Most career performances by a female act (9 shows).
11 July 2025	Linkin Park	From Zero World Tour				
26 July 2025	Stray Kids	dominATE World Tour				
27 July 2025	Stray Kids	dominATE World Tour				
2 August 2025	Blackpink	Deadline World Tour				
3 August 2025	Blackpink	Deadline World Tour				
9 August 2025	AC/DC	Power Up Tour	The Pretty Reckless			
13 August 2025	AC/DC	Power Up Tour	The Pretty Reckless			
29 May 2026	Aya Nakamura					First French Black woman to headline the stadium
30 May 2026	Aya Nakamura					First French Black woman to headline the stadium
31 May 2026	Aya Nakamura					First French Black woman to headline the stadium
18 June 2026	Bruno Mars	The Romantic Tour	DJ Pee .Wee; Victoria Monét			
20 June 2026	Bruno Mars	The Romantic Tour	DJ Pee .Wee; Victoria Monét			
21 June 2026	Bruno Mars	The Romantic Tour	DJ Pee .Wee; Victoria Monét			
July 2	System of a Down	2026 UK & European Tour	Queens of the Stone Age; Acid Bath			
8 July 2026	The Weeknd	After Hours til Dawn Tour	Playboi Carti			
10 July 2026	The Weeknd	After Hours til Dawn Tour	Playboi Carti			
11 July 2026	The Weeknd	After Hours til Dawn Tour	Playboi Carti			
12 July 2026	The Weeknd	After Hours til Dawn Tour	Playboi Carti			
17 July 2026	BTS	Arirang World Tour		184,502	$30,610,025	
18 July 2026	BTS	Arirang World Tour		184,502	$30,610,025	
5 September 2026	PLK					
6 September 2026	PLK					
10 September 2026	Jay-Z	JAŸ-Z 30 Tour				
19 September 2026	BigBang	XX: Cosmos World Tour				

== Noise record ==
On 12 May 2012, the French heavy metal band Gojira performed at the stadium as the opening act for Metallica during their European Black Album Tour. Gojira's concert was measured at 120 decibels in the corridors backstage, which broke the record for the loudest sound ever recorded at Stade de France.

On 11 April 2015, the crowd noise produced by the 80,000 people at Stade de France during the 2015 Coupe de la Ligue Final reached 109 decibels, which set the world record for the noisiest stadium recorded during a final match of a football tournament.

== Tenants ==
Stade de France has as a regular tenant only the national football and national rugby teams. Repeated attempts to persuade a professional football or rugby team to move there have failed so far. Upon the construction of the stadium, Paris Saint-Germain declined to move there, choosing to remain at the Parc des Princes under pressure from its then-owner (pay-TV network Canal Plus) and the Paris city government.

However, the Paris rugby club Stade Français have now established themselves as a semi-regular tenant. They began by scheduling their Top 14 home fixture on 15 October 2005 against Toulouse at Stade de France. Stade Français's president, Max Guazzini, publicly said that the club would have to sell 25,000 to 30,000 tickets to break even. Three weeks before the match, 61,000 tickets had been sold, setting a French record for tickets sold to a league match for any sport, including football. The final attendance was 79,454, smashing the national attendance record for a league match in any sport by more than 20,000. Five minutes before the end of the Toulouse match, Guazzini announced to the crowd that Stade Français's scheduled home fixture against Biarritz in March 2006 would also be held at Stade de France. The Stade-Biarritz match broke the attendance record from earlier in the season, with 79,604 present.

Guazzini then booked Stade de France for the same two league fixtures in 2006–07. The Biarritz match on 16 October 2006 drew 79,619, making this the third consecutive Stade Français fixture at Stade de France to set an all-time French attendance record. The record was broken yet again at a match against Toulouse on 27 January 2007, with 79,741 filling the stands. Stade Français went on to schedule three home matches at Stade de France in the 2007–08 season. For the 2008–09 season, they booked Stade de France for three home league matches and a Heineken Cup pool match. The number of Stade Français home matches at Stade de France increased again for 2009–10, with five Top 14 fixtures already announced for the stadium.

Even with the lack of a regular league tenant, the stadium's revenue increased greatly in 2007, as it was used extensively during the 2007 Rugby World Cup in France, where it hosted numerous pool matches, a quarterfinal match, both of the semi-finals and the final.

The Lille OSC football team played all its "home" games in European competition during the 2005–06 season, both in the UEFA Champions League and the UEFA Cup, at Stade de France because its own stadium was then under renovation, and the only nearer alternative on French soil, Stade Félix-Bollaert, was not available as that ground's occupant, Lille's local rival Lens, was also participating in the UEFA Cup. Stade de France has hosted the Champions League final on three occasions: 2000 (Real Madrid 3 Valencia 0), 2006 (Barcelona 2 Arsenal 1), and 2022 (Real Madrid 1 Liverpool 0).

=== Rugby ===
France's governing body for rugby union, the French Rugby Federation (FFR), announced in November 2010 that it would not renew its deal to use Stade de France for international rugby matches when it expired in 2013. FFR also stated that it planned to build a new stadium of its own in the Paris region.

Reportedly, the FFR had become increasingly frustrated with several aspects of the deal. According to rugby journalist Ian Moriarty, "The deal with the Stade de France has been a disaster for the FFR financially over the years, forcing France's powerbrokers to look across the English channel at the RFU's Twickenham cash cow with ever increasing envy." Reports vary widely as to how much the FFR must spend to rent out the stadium, but estimates range from €3 million to €5 million per match. Although Stade de France and Twickenham are roughly the same size, the rental expense means that the FFR reportedly makes about one-third as much from a Stade de France sellout as does the RFU from a sellout at Twickenham. In addition, the national rugby team does not enjoy primacy at Stade de France; the national football team and major concerts take priority. FFR had to move two of its 2010–11 home Tests to Montpellier and Nantes due to fixture clashes with the national football team. Also, former FFR president Serge Blanco claimed that the 2009 Top 14 final had to be moved from May to June because of a conflict with a Johnny Hallyday rock concert.

In June 2012, FFR announced that it had selected the site for its new ground, tentatively known as Grand Stade FFR. The 82,000-seat stadium, featuring a retractable roof and slide-out pitch, was to be built on a former horse racing track in Évry, about 25 km (16 mi) south of Paris. The new stadium, estimated to cost €600 million, was originally scheduled to open in 2017, but completion was later pushed back to the 2021/2022 time frame. FFR officially abandoned the stadium project in December 2016.

== Access ==
Although located at the crossroads of auto-routes A1 and A86, it is not advisable to go there by car unless one has reserved parking. The stadium was built with a very limited number of parking spaces, which is why public transport is considered the primary means of getting to the stadium. River shuttles are provided by the Canal Saint-Denis.

As part of the development of the stadium, two new RER stations were built (La Plaine Stade de France and Stade de France–Saint-Denis) and a Paris Metro station (Saint-Denis–Porte de Paris) was expanded to serve the large crowds.

As part of the Grand Paris Express project and 2024 Olympic and Paralympic Games, a new station at Saint-Denis–Pleyel opened in 2024, with a new bridge connecting to the Stade de France–Saint-Denis station and the Stade de France. Initially served by Line 14 in time for the Olympic and Paralympic Games, the station will eventually serve 4 different Metro lines.

Public transport stations serving Stade de France
Station	Distance	Line
Saint-Denis–Porte de Paris	300 metres (980 ft)	Paris Metro Line 13 and Tramway Line 8
La Plaine Stade de France	500 metres (1,600 ft)	RER B
Stade de France–Saint-Denis	1,100 metres (3,600 ft)	RER D
Saint-Denis – Pleyel	1,500 metres (4,900 ft)	Paris Metro Line 14
Front Populaire	2,000 metres (6,600 ft)	Paris Metro Line 12

== See also ==
- List of tourist attractions in Paris
- List of football stadiums in France
- List of national stadiums
- List of rugby union stadiums by capacity
- Lists of stadiums

Events and tenants
Preceded by Soldier Field; Chicago	FIFA World Cup; Opening venue 1998	Succeeded by Seoul World Cup Stadium; Seoul
Preceded by Rose Bowl; Los Angeles (Pasadena)	FIFA World Cup; Final venue 1998	Succeeded by International Stadium; Yokohama
Preceded by Camp Nou; Barcelona	UEFA Champions League; Final venue 2000	Succeeded by San Siro; Milan
Preceded by International Stadium; Yokohama	FIFA Confederations Cup; Final venue 2003	Succeeded by Waldstadion; Frankfurt
Preceded by Commonwealth Stadium; Edmonton	IAAF World Championships in Athletics; Main venue 2003	Succeeded by Helsinki Olympic Stadium; Helsinki
Preceded by Atatürk Olympic Stadium; Istanbul	UEFA Champions League; Final venue 2006	Succeeded by Olympic Stadium; Athens
Preceded by Telstra Stadium; Sydney	Rugby World Cup; Final venue 2007	Succeeded by Eden Park; Auckland
Preceded by NSC Olimpiyskiy; Kyiv	UEFA European Championship; Final venue 2016	Succeeded by Wembley Stadium; London
Preceded by Estádio do Dragão; Porto	UEFA Champions League; Final venue 2022	Succeeded by Atatürk Olympic Stadium; Istanbul
Preceded by International Stadium; Yokohama	Rugby World Cup; Final venue 2023	Succeeded by TBD
Preceded by Japan National Stadium; Tokyo	Summer Olympics; Athletics competitions Main venue 2024	Succeeded by Los Angeles Memorial Coliseum
