= Don't Tread on Me (Metallica song) =

1991 promotional single by Metallica

Promotional single by Metallica

from the album Metallica
- Released: August 29, 1991
- Recorded: October 1990 – June 1991
- Studio: One on One (Los Angeles)
- Genre: Heavy metal
- Length: 3:59
- Label: Elektra
- Composers: James Hetfield; Lars Ulrich
- Lyricist: James Hetfield
- Producers: Bob Rock; James Hetfield; Lars Ulrich

"Don't Tread on Me" is a song by American heavy metal band Metallica from their self-titled fifth album. The title is connected with the American Revolutionary War. The words "Don't Tread on Me" constitute the motto of the Gadsden flag, and the snake image on the flag is pictured on the cover of the album.

== Music and lyrics ==
The instrumental introduction uses an eight-bar phrase from "America", a popular song from the musical West Side Story. It is in a moderate tempo of 104 bpm in 12/8.

The lyrics reference American Revolutionary Patrick Henry's quote "give me liberty or give me death!" with the line "liberty or death, what we so proudly hail". The lyric, "To secure peace, is to prepare for war" refers to the Latin adage Si vis pacem, para bellum ("If you want peace, prepare [for] a war"). The lyrics containing rattlesnake imagery are inspired by Benjamin Franklin's essay suggesting the rattlesnake is a good symbol for the American Spirit.

Hetfield said the song was a reaction to the anti-establishment tone of their album ...And Justice for All: "This is the other side of that. America is a fucking good place. I definitely think that. And that feeling came about from touring a lot. You find out what you like about certain places and you find out why you live in America, even with all the bad fucked-up shit. It's still the most happening place to hang out."

Hetfield also said "Don't Tread on Me, I love the song, but it shocked a lot of people, because everyone thought it was pro-war when they thought we were anti-war, and alls we're doing is writing songs, we're not standing politically on any side. Don't Tread on Me was just one of those 'don't fuck with us' songs, and obviously referencing the flag and the snake and what it meant, that all tied into the black album and the snake icon on the album cover, and I think it's great to play that song live. We're over here in Europe playing it, and people aren't appalled by the songs. We haven't played it in Iraq or Iran yet, though."

The main guitar riff has been sampled on the song "Surface Patterns" by Canadian industrial band Front Line Assembly, from their 1994 album Millennium.

== Personnel ==
Credits are taken from the album's liner notes.

- James Hetfield – guitars, vocals
- Lars Ulrich – drums
- Kirk Hammett – lead guitar
- Jason Newsted – bass

== Live performances ==
The song was never performed live until the European 2012 tour celebrating the 20th anniversary of the Black Album, starting at the tour's first show in Prague. At the end of the concert, Hetfield mentioned that the band liked the live sound of songs ("Don't Tread on Me" and "My Friend of Misery") that they played live for the first time. Previously, Hetfield was said to have disliked the song, as revealed in an April 2001 interview with Playboy magazine, in which he stated: "There are some songs on there I don't like. 'Don't Tread on Me', probably not one of my favorite songs musically."

== Reception ==
The tune was named by journalist John J. Miller of the conservative news magazine National Review as one of the "50 Greatest Conservative Rock songs"; placed as No. 9 on the list, Miller praised it as a "tribute to the doctrine of peace through strength".

=== Cougar incident ===
In 2019, Dee Gallant of Duncan, British Columbia, Canada, was walking her dog on a logging road near the town when she realized a cougar was approaching them. After shouting did not make it go away, she selected "Don't Tread on Me" as the loudest song on her cellphone, and when she played it, the cougar left. The following week, after news of the event had spread, she received a friendly phone call from lead singer James Hetfield.

== Certifications ==
Certifications for "Don't Tread on Me"
| Region | Certification | Certified units/sales |
|---|---|---|
| United States (RIAA) | Gold | 500,000^{‡} |
^{‡} Sales+streaming figures based on certification alone.
