= Metallica 2021–2022 Tour =

International concert tour

2021–2022 tours
- World tour by Metallica
- Location: Europe; North America; South America
- Associated album: Metallica (30th anniversary reissue)
- Start date: September 16, 2021
- End date: December 16, 2022
- Legs: 5
- No. of shows: 38
- Box office: $43,398,993

Metallica concert chronology
- WorldWired Tour (2016–2019); 2021–2022 tours; M72 World Tour (2023–2027)

American heavy metal band Metallica toured throughout 2021 and 2022 in support of the 30th anniversary of their fifth and self-titled studio album Metallica, the 40th anniversary of the band, and in continuation of the WorldWired Tour. It was their first tour after the COVID-19 pandemic.

It kicked off on September 16, 2021, in San Francisco. The 2022 portion of the tour was titled the Return Of The European Summer Vacation.

Their June 29, 2022 show for Frauenfeld Rocks in Switzerland was cancelled when a member of the band tested positive for COVID-19.

The set list has varied from show to show. They have played some of their hits, such as "Nothing Else Matters", "Enter Sandman", "One" and "Master of Puppets", as well surprises such as "Metal Militia".

== Set list ==
=== Sample 1 ===
The following set list was performed at Discovery Park in Sacramento on October 8, 2021, when the band did not perform any songs from the Black Album.

1. "Whiplash"
2. "Ride the Lightning"
3. "Harvester of Sorrow"
4. "Cyanide"
5. "The Memory Remains"
6. "One"
7. "Frantic"
8. "Moth into Flame"
9. "No Leaf Clover"
10. "For Whom the Bell Tolls"
11. "Whiskey in the Jar"
12. "Fade to Black"
13. "Seek & Destroy"
  Encore
14. "Battery"
15. "Fuel"
16. "Master of Puppets"

=== Sample 2 ===
The following set list was performed at Discovery Park in Sacramento on October 10, 2021, when the band performed all 12 songs from the Black Album in reverse order.

1. "Hardwired"
2. "The Four Horsemen"
3. "Welcome Home (Sanitarium)"
4. "The Struggle Within"
5. "My Friend of Misery"
6. "The God That Failed"
7. "Of Wolf and Man"
8. "Nothing Else Matters"
9. "Through the Never"
10. "Don't Tread on Me"
11. "Wherever I May Roam"
12. "The Unforgiven"
13. "Holier Than Thou"
14. "Sad but True"
15. "Enter Sandman"
  Encore
16. "Fight Fire with Fire"
17. "Creeping Death"

== Tour dates ==
List of 2021 concerts, showing date, city, country, venue, and opening act
Date (2021)	City	Country	Venue	Opening act	Attendance	Revenue
September 16	San Francisco	United States	The Independent	—N/a	—N/a	—N/a
September 20	Chicago	United States	Metro Chicago	—N/a	—N/a	—N/a
September 24 (Note: This performance was part of Louder Than Life.)	Louisville	United States	Kentucky Exposition Center	—N/a	—N/a	—N/a
September 26	Louisville	United States	Kentucky Exposition Center	—N/a	—N/a	—N/a
October 8 (Note: This performance was part of Aftershock.)	Sacramento	United States	Discovery Park	—N/a	—N/a	—N/a
October 10	Sacramento	United States	Discovery Park	—N/a	—N/a	—N/a
November 4	Hollywood	United States	Hard Rock Live	Trivium	6,733 / 6,733	$1,595,650
November 6 (Note: This performance was part of ATLive Concert Series.)	Atlanta	United States	Mercedes-Benz Stadium	—N/a	—N/a	—N/a
November 12 (Note: This performance was part of Welcome to Rockville.)	Daytona Beach	United States	Daytona International Speedway	—N/a	—N/a	—N/a
November 14	Daytona Beach	United States	Daytona International Speedway	—N/a	—N/a	—N/a
November 27 (Note: This performance was part of Triller Fight Club.)	Arlington	United States	Globe Life Field	—N/a	—N/a	—N/a
December 17	San Francisco	United States	Chase Center	DJ Lord	32,514 / 32,514	$4,147,430
December 19	San Francisco	United States	Chase Center	DJ Lord	32,514 / 32,514	$4,147,430

List of 2022 concerts, showing date, city, country, venue, and opening act
Date (2022)	City	Country	Venue	Opening act	Attendance	Revenue
February 25	Las Vegas	United States	Allegiant Stadium	Greta Van Fleet; Ice Nine Kills	44,352 / 44,352	$7,608,341
April 27	Santiago	Chile	Club Hípico de Santiago	Greta Van Fleet	62,681 / 62,681	$3,826,929
April 30	Buenos Aires	Argentina	Campo Argentino de Polo	Greta Van Fleet	54,448 / 54,448	$3,107,672
May 5	Porto Alegre	Brazil	Estacionamento da Fiergs	Greta Van Fleet	40,800 / 40,800	$2,782,519
May 7	Curitiba	Brazil	Estádio Couto Pereira	Greta Van Fleet	42,109 / 42,109	$2,928,121
May 10	São Paulo	Brazil	Estádio do Morumbi	Greta Van Fleet	68,850 / 68,850	$4,465,948
May 12	Belo Horizonte	Brazil	Estádio do Mineirão	Greta Van Fleet	55,344 / 55,344	$3,144,554
May 27 (Note: This performance was part of BottleRock.)	Napa	United States	Napa Valley Expo	—N/a	—N/a	—N/a
May 29 (Note: This performance was part of Boston Calling.)	Boston	United States	Harvard Stadium	—N/a	—N/a	—N/a
June 15 (Note: This performance was part of Copenhell.)	Copenhagen	Denmark	Refshaleøen	—N/a	—N/a	—N/a
June 17 (Note: This performance was part of Pinkpop.)	Landgraaf	Netherlands	Megaland	—N/a	—N/a	—N/a
June 19 (Note: This performance was part of Firenze Rocks.)	Florence	Italy	Visarno Arena	—N/a	—N/a	—N/a
June 22 (Note: This performance was part of Prague Rocks.)	Prague	Czech Republic	Letňany Airport	—N/a	—N/a	—N/a
June 24 (Note: This performance was part of Download Germany.)	Hockenheim	Germany	Hockenheimring	—N/a	—N/a	—N/a
June 26 (Note: This performance was part of Hellfest.)	Clisson	France	Val de Moine	—N/a	—N/a	—N/a
July 1 (Note: This performance was part of Rock Werchter.)	Werchter	Belgium	Festivalpark	—N/a	—N/a	—N/a
July 3 (Note: This performance was part of Bilbao Bizkaia Rock Day.)	Bilbao	Spain	Estadio San Mamés	—N/a	—N/a	—N/a
July 6 (Note: This performance was part of Mad Cool.)	Madrid	Spain	Valdebebas	—N/a	—N/a	—N/a
July 8 (Note: This performance was part of NOS Alive.)	Lisbon	Portugal	Passeio Marítimo de Algés	—N/a	—N/a	—N/a
July 28 (Note: This performance was part of Lollapalooza.)	Chicago	United States	Grant Park	—N/a	—N/a	—N/a
August 11	Buffalo	United States	Highmark Stadium	Greta Van Fleet; Ice Nine Kills	40,700 / 40,700	$4,800,000
August 14	Pittsburgh	United States	PNC Park	Greta Van Fleet; Ice Nine Kills	—N/a	—N/a
September 24 (Note: This performance was part of the Global Citizen Festival.)	New York City	United States	Central Park	—N/a	—N/a	—N/a
November 6	Hollywood	United States	Hard Rock Live	Raven	—N/a	—N/a
December 16 (Note: This performance was part of the All Within My Hands Helping Hands Concert & Auction event.)	Los Angeles	United States	Microsoft Theater	Greta Van Fleet	—N/a	—N/a
Total					448,531+	$38,407,164+

== Cancelled dates ==
Date	City	Country	Venue	Reason for cancellation
June 29, 2022	Frauenfeld	Switzerland	Grosse Allmend Frauenfeld (Note: This performance was supposed to be a part of Frauenfeld Rocks.)	Canceled due to positive COVID-19 test

== Personnel ==
- James Hetfield – lead vocals, rhythm guitar, acoustic guitar
- Lars Ulrich – drums
- Kirk Hammett – lead guitar, backing vocals
- Robert Trujillo – bass guitar, backing vocals
