= S&M2 =

2020 live album by Metallica

Live album by Metallica and the San Francisco Symphony
- Released: August 28, 2020
- Recorded: September 6 & 8, 2019
- Venue: Chase Center (San Francisco)
- Genre: Symphonic metal
- Length: 143:25
- Label: Blackened
- Producers: Greg Fidelman; James Hetfield; Lars Ulrich

Metallica chronology
Hardwired... to Self-Destruct (2016)	S&M2 (2020)	72 Seasons (2023)

Singles from S&M2
- 1. "All Within My Hands" Released: July 15, 2020

S&M2 (stylized as S&M^{2}; an abbreviation of Symphony and Metallica 2) is a live album by American thrash metal band Metallica and the San Francisco Symphony. It is a follow-up to S&M, a live collaborative album released in 1999. The album was recorded during a live performance in San Francisco at the Chase Center in 2019. The performance was also filmed and released theatrically on October 9, 2019.

== Background and recording ==
On April 21 and 22, 1999, Metallica, in collaboration with the San Francisco Symphony and Michael Kamen, recorded and filmed a concert at the Berkeley Community Theater. The performance was released as a film and a live album in November 1999.

In March 2019, Metallica announced the S&M2 concert. The concert, which was similarly performed in collaboration with the San Francisco Symphony, was planned in celebration of the 20th anniversary of S&M. The concert was recorded and filmed at the Chase Center in San Francisco on September 6 and 8, 2019, with Edwin Outwater and Michael Tilson Thomas (Note: Edwin Outwater served as the primary conductor. Thomas only conducted during the performance of "Scythian Suite, Opus 20 II: The Enemy God and the Dance of the Dark Spirits", "The Iron Foundry, Opus 19" and "The Unforgiven III", and conducted "Enter Sandman" before moving to keyboards and leaving Outwater conducting) conducting the symphony orchestra. The concert also marked the grand opening of the Chase Center. Filming was directed by Wayne Isham, who also directed S&M.

== Release ==
The film was released in theaters on October 9, 2019. It earned over $1.2 million at the North American box office, and totaled $5.5 million internationally, making it the highest-grossing rock cinema event ever. As a result, the film was shown theatrically for a second time on October 30, 2019.

The live album was released on August 28, 2020. The Blu-ray release included a new revised version of the film seen in theaters edited by the band, with remixed and remastered audio plus behind the scenes footage.

== Critical reception ==
Professional ratings
Aggregate scores
Source	Rating
Metacritic	78/100
Review scores
Source	Rating
AllMusic	3.5/5 stars
Clash	7/10
Classic Rock	9/10
Consequence of Sound	B+
Kerrang!	5/5 stars
Metal Hammer	4/5 stars
Mojo	4/5 stars
Pitchfork	5.2/10
Slant Magazine	3.5/5 stars

At Metacritic, the album received an average score of 78 based on eight reviews, indicating "generally favorable reviews".

Critics generally praised the album as a worthy successor of S&M. Paul Brannigan of Kerrang! gave the performance a perfect rating, writing that the album "stands as a tribute both to Metallica’s growing confidence as players and composers, and an absolute vindication of their decision to revisit one of their most inspired creative outings."

In a mixed review, Andy Cush of Pitchfork felt that the album had the same issues that S&M did. Cush wrote that the songs are not suited to an orchestral accompaniment, writing "Metallica’s best songs, intricate and ambitious though they may be, are not actually well suited for the additional orchestrating they get here, precisely because they are plenty symphonic already." Cush was also critical of the song selection for S&M2, noting that "Of the 20 pieces of music here, more than half appeared in a similar form more than two decades ago on the first S&M."

== Commercial performance ==
S&M2 debuted at No. 4 on Billboard with 56,000 equivalent album units, with 53,000 units of that coming from album sales.

== Track listing ==
Disc 1
No.	Title	Writer(s)	Original album	Length
1.	"The Ecstasy of Gold" (instrumental)	Ennio Morricone	The Good, the Bad and the Ugly	2:41
2.	"The Call of Ktulu" (instrumental)	James Hetfield; Lars Ulrich; Cliff Burton; Dave Mustaine	Ride the Lightning	9:14
3.	"For Whom the Bell Tolls"	Hetfield; Ulrich; Burton	Ride the Lightning	4:37
4.	"The Day That Never Comes"	Hetfield; Ulrich; Kirk Hammett; Robert Trujillo	Death Magnetic	8:27
5.	"The Memory Remains"	Hetfield; Ulrich	Reload	5:42
6.	"Confusion"	Hetfield; Ulrich	Hardwired... to Self-Destruct	6:41
7.	"Moth into Flame"	Hetfield; Ulrich	Hardwired... to Self-Destruct	6:18
8.	"The Outlaw Torn"	Hetfield; Ulrich	Load	10:03
9.	"No Leaf Clover"	Hetfield; Ulrich	S&M	5:30
10.	"Halo on Fire"	Hetfield; Ulrich	Hardwired...to Self-Destruct	8:17
Total length:				67:30

Disc 2
No.	Title	Writer(s)	Original album	Length
1.	"Intro to Scythian Suite"			5:17
2.	"Scythian Suite, Opus 20 II: The Enemy God and the Dance of the Dark Spirits" (instrumental)	Sergei Prokofiev		3:39
3.	"Intro to the Iron Foundry"			1:03
4.	"The Iron Foundry, Opus 19" (instrumental)	Alexander Mosolov		4:16
5.	"The Unforgiven III"	Hetfield; Ulrich; Hammett; Trujillo	Death Magnetic	8:19
6.	"All Within My Hands" (Acoustic)	Hetfield; Ulrich; Hammett; Bob Rock	St. Anger	6:13
7.	"(Anesthesia) - Pulling Teeth" (instrumental)	Burton	Kill 'Em All	7:27
8.	"Wherever I May Roam"	Hetfield; Ulrich	Metallica	6:32
9.	"One"	Hetfield; Ulrich	...And Justice for All	9:23
10.	"Master of Puppets"	Hetfield; Ulrich; Burton; Hammett	Master of Puppets	8:29
11.	"Nothing Else Matters"	Hetfield; Ulrich	Metallica	6:39
12.	"Enter Sandman"	Hetfield; Ulrich; Hammett	Metallica	8:45
Total length:				Disc two: 76:42; Total: 143:25

Blu-ray
No.	Title	Length
1.	"Intro (Wherever I May Roam / All Within My Hands)" (medley)
2.	"The Ecstasy of Gold" (instrumental)
3.	"The Call of Ktulu" (instrumental)
4.	"For Whom the Bell Tolls"
5.	"The Day That Never Comes"
6.	"The Memory Remains"
7.	"Confusion"
8.	"Moth into Flame"
9.	"The Outlaw Torn"
10.	"No Leaf Clover"
11.	"Halo on Fire"
12.	"Intro to Scythian Suite"
13.	"Scythian Suite, Opus 20 II: The Enemy God and The Dance of the Dark Spirits" (instrumental)
14.	"Intro to the Iron Foundry"
15.	"The Iron Foundry, Opus 19" (instrumental)
16.	"The Unforgiven III"
17.	"All Within My Hands (Acoustic)"
18.	"(Anesthesia) – Pulling Teeth" (instrumental)
19.	"Wherever I May Roam"
20.	"One"
21.	"Master of Puppets"
22.	"Nothing Else Matters"
23.	"Enter Sandman"
24.	"Credits"
25.	"Behind the Scenes: Making of the Show"
26.	"All Within My Hands Promo"

== Personnel ==
Metallica

- James Hetfield – lead vocals, rhythm guitar, guitar solo on "Nothing Else Matters", "Master of Puppets" and "The Outlaw Torn", acoustic (rhythm) guitar on "All Within My Hands", production
- Lars Ulrich – drums, production
- Kirk Hammett – lead guitar, backing vocals, acoustic (lead) guitar on "All Within My Hands", Coral electric sitar on "Wherever I May Roam"
- Robert Trujillo – bass guitar, backing vocals

San Francisco Symphony

- Edwin Outwater – conductor
- Michael Tilson Thomas – conductor on "Scythian Suite, Opus 20 II: The Enemy God and the Dance of the Dark Spirits", "The Iron Foundry, Opus 19", "The Unforgiven III" and "Enter Sandman", keyboards on "Enter Sandman"
- Scott Pingel – bass solo for "(Anesthesia) – Pulling Teeth"
- Nadya Tichman (concertmaster), Jeremy Constant, Mariko Smiley, Melissa Kleinbart, Sarn Oliver, Naomi Kazama Hull, Victor Romasevich, Yun Chu, Yukiko Kurakata, Katie Kadarauch – first violins
- Jessie Fellows, Polina Sedukh, David Chernyavsky, Raushan Akhmedyarova, Chen Zhao, Adam Smyla, Sarah Knutson, Yuna Lee – second violins
- Yun Jie Liu, John Schoening, Christina King, Gina Cooper, David Gaudry, Matthew Young, David Kim, Nanci Severance – violas
- Amos Yang, Margaret Tait, Jill Rachuy Brindel, Stephen Tramontozzi, Shu-Yi Pai, Richard Andaya, Miriam Perkoff, Adelle-Akiko Kearns – cellos
- Scott Pingel, Daniel G. Smith, S. Mark Wright, Charles Chandler, Chris Gilbert, William Ritchen – double basses
- Robin McKee, Linda Lukas, Catherine Payne – flutes
- James Button, Pamela Smith, Russ deLuna – oboes
- Luis Baez, David Neuman, Jerome Simas – clarinets
- Stephen Paulson, Rob Weir, Steven Braunstein – bassons
- Robert Ward, Jonathan Ring, Bruce Roberts, Daniel Hawkins, Chris Cooper, Joshua Paulus, Jeff Garza – horns
- Aaron Schuman, Joseph Brown, Robert Giambruno, John Freeman – trumpets
- Timothy Higgins, Nick Platoff, John Engelkes, Jeff Budin – trombones
- Jeffrey Anderson – tuba
- Edward Stephan – timpani
- Jacob Nissly, James Lee Wyatt III, Tom Hemphill, Robert Klieger – percussion
- Douglas Rioth – harp
- Marc Shapiro – keyboard
- Margo Kieser, John Campbell, Matt Gray – librarians

Additional musicians

- Avi Vinocur – backing vocals on "All Within My Hands"

Technical personnel

- Greg Fidelman – production, mixing
- Edwin Outwater – musical direction
- Michael Tilson Thomas – additional conceptualization
- Bruce Coughlin, Michael Kamen – arrangement
- Scott Pingel – arrangement on "(Anesthesia) – Pulling Teeth"
- Emily Grisham, Adriana Grace, David Horne, Larry Spivack, Frederick Alden Terry – copyists
- Ann Shuttlesworth, Patrick DiCenso – transcribers
- John Harris, Jay Vicari, Brian Flanzbaum – recording engineering
- Bran Vibberts, Bob Wartinbee, Charlie Campbell, Mike Fortunato, Jimmy Goldsmith, Dave Schwerkolt – recording crew
- Sara Lyn Killion, Dan Monti, Jim Monti, Jason Gossman, Kent Matcke, Billy Joe Bowers – engineering, editing
- Bob Ludwig – mastering
- Anton Corbijn – band photography
- Stan Musilek – cover/instrument photography
- Brett Murray – additional audience photography
- David Turner – album package design, art direction
- Alex Tenta – album package layout, additional art direction

== Charts ==
=== Weekly charts ===
Weekly chart performance of S&M2
Chart (2020)	Peak position
Australian Albums (ARIA)	1
Austrian Albums (Ö3 Austria)	1
Belgian Albums (Ultratop Flanders)	1
Belgian Albums (Ultratop Wallonia)	2
Canadian Albums (Billboard)	4
Croatian International Albums (HDU)	1
Czech Albums (ČNS IFPI)	4
Danish Albums (Hitlisten)	3
Dutch Albums (Album Top 100)	1
Finnish Albums (Suomen virallinen lista)	3
French Albums (SNEP)	4
German Albums (Offizielle Top 100)	1
Hungarian Albums (MAHASZ)	2
Irish Albums (Official Charts)	2
Italian Albums (FIMI)	13
New Zealand Albums (RMNZ)	7
Norwegian Albums (VG-lista)	6
Polish Albums (ZPAV)	3
Portuguese Albums (AFP)	1
Scottish Albums (Official Charts)	1
Spanish Albums (PROMUSICAE)	3
Swiss Albums (Schweizer Hitparade)	2
UK Albums (Official Charts)	2
UK Rock & Metal Albums (Official Charts)	1
US Billboard 200	4
US Top Classical Albums (Billboard)	1
US Top Hard Rock Albums (Billboard)	1
US Top Rock Albums (Billboard)	1

=== Year-end charts ===
2020 year-end chart performance for S&M2
Chart (2020)	Position
Austrian Albums (Ö3 Austria)	71
Belgian Albums (Ultratop Flanders)	123
Belgian Albums (Ultratop Wallonia)	55
French Albums (SNEP)	183
German Albums (Offizielle Top 100)	7
Polish Albums (ZPAV)	30
Spanish Albums (PROMUSICAE)	81
Swiss Albums (Schweizer Hitparade)	42
US Top Classical Albums (Billboard)	1
US Top Rock Albums (Billboard)	58

2021 year-end chart performance for S&M2
Chart (2021)	Position
US Top Classical Albums (Billboard)	10

== Certifications ==
Certifications and sales for S&M2
Region	Certification	Certified units/sales
France (SNEP)	Gold	50,000^{‡}
Germany (BVMI)	Gold	100,000^{‡}
Poland (ZPAV)	Gold	10,000^{‡}
^{‡} Sales+streaming figures based on certification alone.
