= All Within My Hands =

2003 song by Metallica

Song by Metallica

from the album St. Anger
- Released: June 5, 2003
- Genre: Nu metal
- Length: 8:48
- Label: Elektra
- Songwriters: James Hetfield; Lars Ulrich; Kirk Hammett; Bob Rock
- Producers: Bob Rock; Metallica

"All Within My Hands (Live)"

Single by Metallica

from the album S&M2
- Released: July 15, 2020
- Recorded: September 6 and 8, 2019
- Venue: Chase Center (San Francisco)
- Genre: Symphonic rock; acoustic rock
- Length: 6:13 (album version); 4:48 (radio edit)
- Label: Blackened
- Songwriters: James Hetfield; Kirk Hammett; Lars Ulrich; Bob Rock
- Producers: Greg Fidelman; James Hetfield; Lars Ulrich

Metallica singles chronology
"Spit Out the Bone" (2017)	"All Within My Hands (Live)" (2020)	"Lux Æterna" (2022)

Music video
- "All Within My Hands (Live)" on YouTube

"All Within My Hands" is a song by the American heavy metal band Metallica. It appears on the studio album St. Anger as the eleventh and closing track and was issued by Elektra Records. It was written by members James Hetfield, Kirk Hammett, Lars Ulrich and producer Bob Rock. It was the longest song on St. Anger, with a runtime of 8 minutes and 48 seconds. Metallica's All Within My Hands Foundation was named after the song.

In 2020, an acoustic live performance of the song from the S&M2 album featuring the San Francisco Symphony, was released as the first single from the album, and it peaked at No. 1 on the Mainstream Rock chart. The song has also been performed eight times, which includes the live performance of "All Within My Hands" from S&M2.

== Personnel ==
=== Studio version ===
==== Metallica ====
- James Hetfield – vocals, guitar
- Kirk Hammett – guitar
- Lars Ulrich – drums

==== Additional musicians ====
- Bob Rock – bass guitar

=== S&M2 version ===
==== Metallica ====
- James Hetfield – lead vocals, guitar
- Kirk Hammett – guitar, backing vocals
- Robert Trujillo – bass guitar, backing vocals
- Lars Ulrich – drums

==== San Francisco Symphony ====
- Edwin Outwater – conductor
- Nadya Tichman (concertmaster), Jeremy Constant, Mariko Smiley, Melissa Kleinbart, Sarn Oliver, Naomi Kazama Hull, Victor Romasevich, Yun Chu, Yukiko Kurakata, Katie Kadarauch – first violins
- Jessie Fellows, Polina Sedukh, David Chernyavsky, Raushan Akhmedyarova, Chen Zhao, Adam Smyla, Sarah Knutson, Yuna Lee – second violins
- Yun Jie Liu, John Schoening, Christina King, Gina Cooper, David Gaudry, Matthew Young, David Kim, Nanci Severance – violas
- Amos Yang, Margaret Tait, Jill Rachuy Brindel, Stephen Tramontozzi, Shu-Yi Pai, Richard Andaya, Miriam Perkoff, Adelle-Akiko Kearns – cellos
- Scott Pingel, Daniel G. Smith, S. Mark Wright, Charles Chandler, Chris Gilbert, William Ritchen – double basses
- Robin McKee, Linda Lukas, Catherine Payne – flutes
- James Button, Pamela Smith, Russ deLuna – oboes
- Luis Baez, David Neuman, Jerome Simas – clarinets
- Stephen Paulson, Rob Weir, Steven Braunstein – bassons
- Robert Ward, Jonathan Ring, Bruce Roberts, Daniel Hawkins, Chris Cooper, Joshua Paulus, Jeff Garza – horns
- Aaron Schuman, Joseph Brown, Robert Giambruno, John Freeman – trumpets
- Timothy Higgins, Nick Platoff, John Engelkes, Jeff Budin – trombones
- Jeffrey Anderson – tuba
- Edward Stephan – timpani
- Jacob Nissly, James Lee Wyatt III, Tom Hemphill, Robert Klieger – percussion
- Douglas Rioth – harp
- Marc Shapiro – keyboard
- Margo Kieser, John Campbell, Matt Gray – librarians

==== Additional musicians ====
- Avi Vinocur – backing vocals

== Charts ==
=== Weekly charts ===
Chart (2020)	Peak position
US Mainstream Rock (Billboard)	1
US Rock & Alternative Airplay (Billboard)	4
US Hot Hard Rock Songs (Billboard)	4

=== Year-end charts ===
Chart (2020)	Peak position
US Mainstream Rock (Billboard)	15
