= Spit Out the Bone =

Single by Metallica

from the album Hardwired... to Self-Destruct
- Released: November 14, 2017
- Recorded: June 2015 – February 2016
- Studio: Metallica's HQ (San Rafael, California)
- Genre: Thrash metal
- Length: 7:09 (album version); 4:37 (radio edit)
- Label: Blackened
- Songwriters: James Hetfield; Lars Ulrich
- Producers: Greg Fidelman; James Hetfield; Lars Ulrich

Metallica singles chronology
"Now That We're Dead" (2017)	"Spit Out the Bone" (2017)	"All Within My Hands" (2020)

"Spit Out the Bone" is a song by American heavy metal band Metallica from their tenth studio album, Hardwired... to Self-Destruct (2016). It was released as the album's fifth and final single on November 14, 2017. Composed by James Hetfield and Lars Ulrich with lyrics primarily written by the former, it is a thrash metal song centered around the idea of a machine-led takeover and genocide of humanity. The song was produced by Greg Fidelman alongside Hetfield and Ulrich.

The song was positively received from critics and fans, with many deeming it as one of the best tracks from Hardwired... to Self-Destruct as well as one of the best in the band's discography; some considered it to be the best Metallica song released in the 21st century. It charted on the Billboard Mainstream Rock chart, the Hot Rock & Alternative Songs chart, and the UK Rock & Metal chart. A music video directed by Phil Mucci was also released.

== Background and release ==
Several years after releasing their previous studio album, Death Magnetic (2008), Metallica's drummer Lars Ulrich confirmed in 2014 that the band was writing material for their next album, having been working on it "off and on" for about a year by that point. The album was recorded at Metallica's HQ in San Rafael, California between June 2015 and February 2016. In February, James Hetfield stated that the album was nearing completion, and Ulrich said that it would likely release later that year, which he restated in April.

One of the songs on the album, "Spit Out the Bone", was co-written by Hetfield and Ulrich. It was the first song recorded for the album, although Robert Trujillo was unsatisfied with his bass part and rerecorded it at the end of the sessions. The song's concept was inspired by "Passenger on the Menu" by British punk rock band GBH, a song predominantly about cannibalism. As "Spit Out the Bone" developed, Hetfield began to "explore another form of human risk", primarily the usage of computers in civilization. He was further inspired by the Terminator media franchise. As the lyrics continued to develop, Ulrich decided to let Hetfield write the song himself, stating that he "really went into his own world and dealt with all of that" when writing. The original version of the song was about nine to ten minutes long before it was trimmed in length.

The album, Hardwired... to Self-Destruct, was formally announced on August 18, and released on November 18. "Spit Out the Bone" is the album's final track. The album was produced by Greg Fidelman alongside Hetfield and Ulrich and published through the band's own record label, Blackened Recordings. Upon release of the album, "Spit Out the Bone" became a fan-favorite track, leading it to become highly requested for Metallica's WorldWired Tour. The band played the song live for the first time on October 24, 2017, at the O2 Arena in London. It was later released as the album's final single on November 14. In the United States, the song reached number 4 on the Billboard Mainstream Rock, and number 32 on Hot Rock & Alternative Songs. In the United Kingdom, the song reached number 27 on the UK Rock & Metal chart.

== Composition and lyrics ==
"Spit Out the Bone" is a thrash metal song that is about seven minutes long. The song features a guitar breakdown at around the three minute mark, a bass solo, and several guitar solos played by Kirk Hammett, including a closing one at the end of the song; Sam Law of Kerrang! described the song as a "blitzkrieg of machine gun percussion and razorblade guitars". Several journalists compared the song's composition and style to be similar to Metallica's debut album, Kill 'Em All (1983).

Lyrically, the song is about the concept of humanity being overrun and nearly driven to extinction by genocidal machines. The theme of the song is demonstrated by lines such as "Long live machine / The futures supreme" and "Utopian solution / Finally cure the Earth of man"; Zoe Camp of Pitchfork interpreted the song as also being representative of man's greed and obsession with technology.

== Critical reception ==
Several reviewers deemed "Spit Out the Bone" as one of the best songs from Hardwired... to Self Destruct in their initial reviews of the album. Sean Barry of Consequence described the song as the album's "secret weapon" after several slower songs, and that it helped solidify Metallica's continued place in metal music. Clash said that it was an "all-guns-blazing finale" that helped the album end on a high note, while Tom Wakenell of Distorted Sound Magazine described it as a "raw onslaught" and the heaviest song that the band had released since the 1980s. Camp felt the song featured elements that weren't present in the band's work since their "glory days", specifically highlighting the "pummeling breakdown".

Several publications have ranked it as one of, if not the best Metallica songs released during the 21st century, as well as one of the best songs from Metallica's whole discography. Metal Hammer deemed it their best song of the century on numerous occasions, each time describing it as a "circle-pit inducing thrash masterclass". Rolling Stone ranked it as Metallica's 19th best song, higher than any other song released during the 21st century that was on the list. Kerrang! ranked it at 20th, and was the only song from the century to appear on that list; Law described it as "easily their best release of the last 24 years". The editorial staff of The A.V. Club ranked it as their 21st best song, though they ranked it lower than several other songs released during the century.

== Music video ==
A music video for "Spit Out the Bone" was released on November 17, 2016, alongside every other song from the album. It was directed by Phil Mucci, who had previously worked on music videos for Korn and Opeth. The clip, which is centered around an unnamed female protagonist, depicts the aftermath of cyborg invasion of Earth, with the cyborgs searching for survivors to forcefully convert into cyborgs. The video was noted for incorporating elements from several post-apocalyptic and martial arts films, and was highly influenced by the Terminator film series.

== Personnel ==
Credits adapted from the Hardwired... to Self-Destruct liner notes

Metallica

- James Hetfield – guitar, vocals, production
- Kirk Hammett – guitar
- Robert Trujillo – bass
- Lars Ulrich – drums, production

Technical

- Greg Fidelman – production, recording, mixing
- Mike Gillies – additional recording
- Sara Lyn Killion – additional recording, assistant engineering
- Dan Monti – digital editing
- Jim Monti – digital editing
- Jason Gossman – digital editing
- Kent Matcke – assistant engineering
- Dave Collins – mastering

== Charts ==
Weekly chart performance for "Spit Out the Bone"
Chart (2016–18)	Peak position
UK Rock & Metal (OCC)	27
US Hot Rock & Alternative Songs (Billboard)	32
US Mainstream Rock Airplay (Billboard)	4

=== Year-end charts ===
Year-end chart performance for "Spit Out the Bone"
Chart (2018)	Peak position
US Mainstream Rock (Billboard)	26
