= WorldWired Tour =

2016–19 concert tour by Metallica

- World tour by Metallica
- Promotional poster for the tour
- Location: Asia; Europe; North America; South America
- Associated album: Hardwired... to Self-Destruct
- Start date: February 6, 2016
- End date: August 25, 2019
- Legs: 13
- No. of shows: 159
- Attendance: 4.1 million (139 shows)
- Box office: $430 million (139 shows)

Metallica concert chronology
- Lords of Summer Tour (2015); WorldWired Tour (2016–2019); 2021–2022 tours

The WorldWired Tour was a concert tour by the American heavy metal band Metallica in support of their tenth studio album Hardwired... to Self-Destruct, which was released on November 18, 2016. It is also their first worldwide tour after the World Magnetic Tour six years earlier.

== Background ==
The tour started on October 26, 2016, in Puerto Rico, followed by four more dates on the Latin American tour.

A performance at the 59th annual Grammy Awards on February 12, 2017, was also a part of the tour.

The tour has grossed $430 million and was attended by more than 4.1 million people from 139 concerts, making it the 5th highest-grossing tour of 2010s.

The tour ended on August 25, 2019, in Mannheim, Germany. The band had plans to continue the tour in late 2019 and early 2020, but the tour dates in Australia were cancelled because of issues James had with alcohol, while the South American leg was postponed to 2022 due to the COVID-19 pandemic.

== Set list ==
The following set list was performed at the Commonwealth Stadium in Edmonton, and is not intended to represent all of the shows on tour.

1. "Hardwired"
2. "Atlas, Rise!"
3. "For Whom the Bell Tolls"
4. "The Memory Remains"
5. "The Unforgiven"
6. "Now That We're Dead"
7. "Moth Into Flame"
8. "Wherever I May Roam"
9. "Halo on Fire"
10. "Hit the Lights"
11. "Sad but True"
12. "One"
13. "Master of Puppets"
14. "Fade to Black"
15. "Seek & Destroy"

Encore

16. "Blackened"
17. "Nothing Else Matters"
18. "Enter Sandman"

=== Kirk/Rob doodle ===
In 2017, Kirk Hammett and Rob Trujillo began to cover songs written by artists from the region in which the concert was being performed.

== Tour dates ==
List of 2016 concerts, showing date, city, country, venue, opening act, tickets sold, number of available tickets and amount of gross revenue
Date (2016)	City	Country	Venue	Opening act	Attendance	Revenue
February 6	San Francisco	United States	AT&T Park	Cage the Elephant	41,119 / 43,681	$4,341,114
August 20	Minneapolis	United States	U.S. Bank Stadium	Avenged Sevenfold; Volbeat	48,492 / 48,492	$5,158,790
September 24 (Note: The concert on September 24, 2016 was part of the Global Citizen Festival.)	New York City	United States	Central Park	—N/a	—N/a	—N/a
September 27	New York City	United States	Webster Hall	—N/a	—N/a	—N/a
October 22 (Note: The concerts on October 22 and October 23, 2016 were part of the 30th Annual Bridge School Benefit.)	Mountain View	United States	Shoreline Amphitheatre	—N/a	—N/a	—N/a
October 23	Mountain View	United States	Shoreline Amphitheatre	—N/a	—N/a	—N/a
October 26	San Juan	Puerto Rico	Coliseo de Puerto Rico	Zafakon	13,039 / 13,641	$1,368,148
October 29	Quito	Ecuador	Parque Bicentenario	Basca	—N/a	—N/a
November 1	Bogotá	Colombia	Hipódromo de Los Andes	Victimized	23,434 / 29,255	$2,145,370
November 3	Guatemala City	Guatemala	Estadio Cementos Progreso	Metal Requiem	—N/a	—N/a
November 5	San Jose	Costa Rica	Estadio Nacional	Heresy	32,934 / 33,953	$2,216,090
November 18	London	England	House of Vans	—N/a	—N/a	—N/a
November 29	Toronto	Canada	The Opera House	—N/a	—N/a	—N/a
December 15	Los Angeles	United States	The Fonda Theatre	—N/a	—N/a	—N/a
December 17	Oakland	United States	Fox Oakland Theatre	—N/a	2,800 / 2,800	$165,550

List of 2017 concerts, showing date, city, country, venue, opening act, tickets sold, number of available tickets and amount of gross revenue
Date (2017)	City	Country	Venue	Opening act	Attendance	Revenue
January 11	Seoul	South Korea	Gocheok Sky Dome	Babymetal	—N/a	—N/a
January 15	Shanghai	China	Mercedes-Benz Arena	—N/a	8,670 / 8,670	$1,178,308
January 18	Beijing	China	LeSports Center	Lang Lang	—N/a	—N/a
January 20	Hong Kong		AsiaWorld–Arena	—N/a	—N/a	—N/a
January 22	Singapore		Singapore Indoor Stadium	—N/a	—N/a	—N/a
February 3	Copenhagen	Denmark	Royal Arena	Hatesphere	59,266 / 59,266	$6,292,736
February 7	Copenhagen	Denmark	Royal Arena	I'll Be Damned	59,266 / 59,266	$6,292,736
February 9	Copenhagen	Denmark	Royal Arena	Defecto	59,266 / 59,266	$6,292,736
February 12 (Note: The concert on February 12, 2017 was part of the Citi Sound Vault concert series.)	Los Angeles	United States	Hollywood Palladium	—N/a	—N/a	—N/a
March 1	Mexico City	Mexico	Foro Sol	Iggy Pop; Cerberus	197,745 / 197,745	$9,744,945
March 3	Mexico City	Mexico	Foro Sol	Iggy Pop; Halcón 7	197,745 / 197,745	$9,744,945
March 5	Mexico City	Mexico	Foro Sol	Iggy Pop; Los Sicarios del Rock & Roll	197,745 / 197,745	$9,744,945
March 25 (Note: The concert on March 25, 2017 was part of Lollapalooza Brazil.)	São Paulo	Brazil	Autódromo José Carlos Pace	Rancid; Cage the Elephant	—N/a	—N/a
March 31 (Note: The concert on March 31, 2017 was part of Lollapalooza Argentina.)	Buenos Aires	Argentina	Hipódromo de San Isidro	Rancid; Cage the Elephant	—N/a	—N/a
April 1 (Note: The concert on April 1, 2017 was part of Lollapalooza Chile.)	Santiago	Chile	O'Higgins Park	Rancid; Cage the Elephant	—N/a	—N/a
May 10	Baltimore	United States	M&T Bank Stadium	Avenged Sevenfold; Volbeat	40,850 / 40,850	$5,001,943
May 12	Philadelphia	United States	Lincoln Financial Field	Volbeat	49,722 / 51,728	$6,104,939
May 14	East Rutherford	United States	MetLife Stadium	Avenged Sevenfold; Volbeat	46,941 / 49,155	$5,955,038
May 17	Uniondale	United States	Nassau Coliseum	Volbeat	14,941 / 14,941	$2,198,951
May 19	Foxborough	United States	Gillette Stadium	Volbeat	47,778 / 48,905	$6,095,723
May 21 (Note: The concert on May 21, 2017 was part of the Rock on the Range festival.)	Columbus	United States	Mapfre Stadium	—N/a	—N/a	—N/a
June 4	St. Louis	United States	Busch Stadium	Volbeat; Local H	38,778 / 41,246	$4,633,807
June 7	Denver	United States	Sports Authority Field at Mile High	Avenged Sevenfold; Volbeat	51,955 / 57,027	$6,299,803
June 9	Newton	United States	Iowa Speedway	Avenged Sevenfold; Volbeat	—N/a	—N/a
June 11	Houston	United States	NRG Stadium	Avenged Sevenfold; Volbeat	45,715 / 47,764	$5,659,560
June 14	San Antonio	United States	Alamodome	Avenged Sevenfold; Local H	45,343 / 47,784	$5,293,857
June 16	Arlington	United States	AT&T Stadium	Avenged Sevenfold; Local H	45,860 / 45,860	$5,481,881
June 18	Chicago	United States	Soldier Field	Avenged Sevenfold; Local H	51,041 / 51,041	$6,095,723
July 5	Orlando	United States	Camping World Stadium	Avenged Sevenfold; Volbeat	49,961 / 53,163	$5,613,708
July 7	Miami Gardens	United States	Hard Rock Stadium	Avenged Sevenfold; Volbeat	42,168 / 45,433	$4,163,523
July 9	Atlanta	United States	SunTrust Park	Avenged Sevenfold; Volbeat	39,024 / 41,246	$4,531,443
July 12	Detroit	United States	Comerica Park	Avenged Sevenfold; Volbeat	40,573 / 43,159	$4,501,650
July 14 (Note: The concert on July 14, 2017 was part of the Quebec City Summer Festival.)	Quebec City	Canada	Plains of Abraham	—N/a	—N/a	—N/a
July 16	Toronto	Canada	Rogers Centre	Avenged Sevenfold; Volbeat	51,018 / 51,018	$6,934,370
July 19	Montreal	Canada	Parc Jean-Drapeau	Avenged Sevenfold; Volbeat	29,218 / 34,375	$3,258,580
July 29	Pasadena	United States	Rose Bowl	Avenged Sevenfold; Gojira	63,285 / 63,285	$6,684,282
August 4	Glendale	United States	University of Phoenix Stadium	Avenged Sevenfold; Gojira	52,926 / 54,881	$5,246,586
August 6	San Diego	United States	Petco Park	Avenged Sevenfold; Gojira	43,491 / 44,916	$4,846,411
August 9	Seattle	United States	CenturyLink Field	Avenged Sevenfold; Gojira	47,175 / 56,082	$4,944,489
August 12 (Note: The concert on August 12, 2017 was part of the Outside Lands Music and Arts Festival.)	San Francisco	United States	Golden Gate Park	—N/a	—N/a	—N/a
August 14	Vancouver	Canada	BC Place	Avenged Sevenfold; Gojira	31,075 / 31,075	$3,405,806
August 16	Edmonton	Canada	Commonwealth Stadium	Avenged Sevenfold; Gojira	44,502 / 44,502	$6,223,238
September 2 (Note: The concert on September 2, 2017, in Copenhagen was originally scheduled on February 5, 2017 but it was rescheduled due doctor's orders.)	Copenhagen	Denmark	Royal Arena	Aphyxion		
September 4	Amsterdam	Netherlands	Ziggo Dome	Kvelertak	33,498 / 33,498	$2,773,774
September 6	Amsterdam	Netherlands	Ziggo Dome	Kvelertak	33,498 / 33,498	$2,773,774
September 8	Paris	France	AccorHotels Arena	Kvelertak	36,765 / 36,765	$3,659,706
September 10	Paris	France	AccorHotels Arena	Kvelertak	36,765 / 36,765	$3,659,706
September 12	Lyon	France	Halle Tony Garnier	Kvelertak	16,062 / 16,062	$1,526,828
September 14	Cologne	Germany	Lanxess Arena	Kvelertak	36,326 / 36,326	$3,850,043
September 16	Cologne	Germany	Lanxess Arena	Kvelertak	36,326 / 36,326	$3,850,043
October 22	London	England	The O_{2} Arena	Kvelertak	39,976 / 41,130	$4,245,290
October 24	London	England	The O_{2} Arena	Kvelertak	39,976 / 41,130	$4,245,290
October 26	Glasgow	Scotland	SSE Hydro	Kvelertak	12,748 / 12,748	$1,382,510
October 28	Manchester	England	Manchester Arena	Kvelertak	19,423 / 19,423	$2,038,870
October 30	Birmingham	England	Genting Arena	Kvelertak	14,811 / 14,811	$1,585,316
November 1	Antwerp	Belgium	Sportpaleis	Kvelertak	45,242 / 45,242	$4,411,706
November 3	Antwerp	Belgium	Sportpaleis	Kvelertak	45,242 / 45,242	$4,411,706
November 9 (Note: The concert on September 9, 2017 was part of the Band Together Bay Area: A Benefit Concert for North Bay Fire Relief event.)	San Francisco	United States	AT&T Park	—N/a	—N/a	—N/a

List of 2018 concerts, showing date, city, country, venue, opening act, tickets sold, number of available tickets and amount of gross revenue
Date (2018)	City	Country	Venue	Opening act	Attendance	Revenue
February 1	Lisbon	Portugal	Altice Arena	Kvelertak	18,248 / 18,248	$1,695,417
February 3	Madrid	Spain	WiZink Center	Kvelertak	33,894 / 33,894	$3,686,603
February 5	Madrid	Spain	WiZink Center	Kvelertak	33,894 / 33,894	$3,686,603
February 7	Barcelona	Spain	Palau Sant Jordi	Kvelertak	17,438 / 17,438	$1,726,177
February 10	Turin	Italy	Pala Alpitour	Kvelertak	14,728 / 14,728	$1,303,943
February 12	Bologna	Italy	Unipol Arena	Kvelertak	29,453 / 29,453	$2,791,531
February 14	Bologna	Italy	Unipol Arena	Kvelertak	29,453 / 29,453	$2,791,531
February 16	Mannheim	Germany	SAP Arena	Kvelertak	14,208 / 14,208	$1,557,877
March 27	Herning	Denmark	Jyske Bank Boxen	Kvelertak	14,906 / 14,906	$1,924,626
March 29	Hamburg	Germany	Barclaycard Arena	Kvelertak	14,415 / 14,415	$1,577,360
March 31	Vienna	Austria	Wiener Stadthalle	Kvelertak	15,811 / 15,811	$1,776,415
April 2	Prague	Czech Republic	O_{2} Arena	Kvelertak	19,221 / 19,221	$2,367,157
April 5	Budapest	Hungary	Budapest Sports Arena	Kvelertak	13,485 / 13,485	$1,325,678
April 7	Stuttgart	Germany	Schleyerhalle	Kvelertak	29,291 / 29,291	$3,334,047
April 9	Stuttgart	Germany	Schleyerhalle	Kvelertak	29,291 / 29,291	$3,334,047
April 11	Geneva	Switzerland	Palexpo	Kvelertak	20,914 / 20,914	$2,534,956
April 26	Munich	Germany	Olympiahalle	Kvelertak	14,706 / 14,706	$1,639,676
April 28	Kraków	Poland	Tauron Arena	Kvelertak	19,751 / 19,751	$2,190,452
April 30	Leipzig	Germany	Arena Leipzig	Kvelertak	12,185 / 12,185	$1,378,421
May 2	Oslo	Norway	Telenor Arena	Kvelertak	24,836 / 24,836	$2,300,122
May 5	Stockholm	Sweden	Ericsson Globe	Kvelertak	32,990 / 32,990	$2,903,553
May 7	Stockholm	Sweden	Ericsson Globe	Kvelertak	32,990 / 32,990	$2,903,553
May 9	Helsinki	Finland	Hartwall Arena	Kvelertak	28,589 / 28,589	$2,651,938
May 11	Helsinki	Finland	Hartwall Arena	Kvelertak	28,589 / 28,589	$2,651,938
September 2	Madison	United States	Kohl Center	Jim Breuer	16,137 / 16,137	$1,995,140
September 4	Minneapolis	United States	Target Center	Jim Breuer	17,873 / 17,873	$2,407,742
September 6	Lincoln	United States	Pinnacle Bank Arena	Jim Breuer	14,950 / 14,950	$1,825,630
September 8	Grand Forks	United States	Alerus Center	Jim Breuer	16,970 / 16,970	$1,912,505
September 11	Sioux Falls	United States	Denny Sanford Premier Center	Jim Breuer	12,018 / 12,018	$1,494,540
September 13	Winnipeg	Canada	Bell MTS Place	Jim Breuer	17,129 / 17,129	$1,913,053
September 15	Saskatoon	Canada	SaskTel Centre	Jim Breuer	16,874 / 16,874	$1,922,719
October 6 (Note: The concerts on October 6 and October 13, 2018 were part of the Austin City Limits Music Festival.)	Austin	United States	Zilker Park	Jim Breuer	—N/a	—N/a
October 13	Austin	United States	Zilker Park	Jim Breuer	—N/a	—N/a
October 16	Milwaukee	United States	Fiserv Forum	Jim Breuer	17,091 / 17,091	$2,185,835
October 18	Pittsburgh	United States	PPG Paints Arena	Jim Breuer	18,502 / 18,765	$2,359,924
October 20	State College	United States	Bryce Jordan Center	Jim Breuer	15,588 / 15,588	$1,919,035
October 22	Charlotte	United States	Spectrum Center	Jim Breuer	17,718 / 17,718	$2,085,875
October 25	Philadelphia	United States	Wells Fargo Center	Jim Breuer	18,545 / 18,545	$2,163,595
October 27	Buffalo	United States	KeyBank Center	Jim Breuer	18,542 / 18,542	$2,290,542
October 29	Albany	United States	Times Union Center	Jim Breuer	15,661 / 15,661	$1,936,231
November 26	Las Vegas	United States	T-Mobile Arena	Jim Breuer	19,032 / 19,032	$2,551,915
November 28	Boise	United States	Taco Bell Arena	Jim Breuer	11,868 / 12,719	$1,454,270
November 30	Salt Lake City	United States	Vivint Smart Home Arena	Jim Breuer	16,215 / 16,215	$2,026,905
December 2	Spokane	United States	Spokane Veterans Memorial Arena	Jim Breuer	12,854 / 12,916	$1,597,670
December 5	Portland	United States	Moda Center	Jim Breuer	18,273 / 18,273	$2,285,680
December 7	Sacramento	United States	Golden 1 Center	Jim Breuer	16,591 / 16,591	$2,069,225
December 9	Fresno	United States	Save Mart Center	Jim Breuer	14,854 / 14,854	$1,855,485

List of 2019 concerts, showing date, city, country, venue, opening act, tickets sold, number of available tickets and amount of gross revenue
Date (2019)	City	Country	Venue	Opening act	Attendance	Revenue
January 18	Tulsa	United States	BOK Center	Jim Breuer	17,612 / 17,612	$2,195,900
January 20	North Little Rock	United States	Verizon Arena	Jim Breuer	17,432 / 17,859	$1,679,923
January 22	Birmingham	United States	Legacy Arena	Jim Breuer	17,462 / 18,003	$1,713,460
January 24	Nashville	United States	Bridgestone Arena	Jim Breuer	16,340 / 16,340	$2,213,550
January 28	Raleigh	United States	PNC Arena	Jim Breuer	20,052 / 20,052	$2,409,015
January 30	Cincinnati	United States	U.S. Bank Arena	Jim Breuer	16,587 / 17,070	$2,060,625
February 1	Cleveland	United States	Quicken Loans Arena	Jim Breuer	18,515 / 18,515	$2,463,702
February 28	El Paso	United States	Don Haskins Center	Jim Breuer	12,546 / 12,546	$1,558,320
March 2	Lubbock	United States	United Supermarkets Arena	Jim Breuer	14,653 / 14,653	$1,813,730
March 4	Wichita	United States	Intrust Bank Arena	Jim Breuer	15,187 / 15,187	$1,648,058
March 6	Kansas City	United States	Sprint Center	Jim Breuer	18,535 / 18,535	$2,047,000
March 9	Louisville	United States	KFC Yum! Center	Jim Breuer	21,657 / 21,657	$2,531,895
March 11	Indianapolis	United States	Bankers Life Fieldhouse	Jim Breuer	17,068 / 17,068	$2,129,940
March 13	Grand Rapids	United States	Van Andel Arena	Jim Breuer	11,692 / 11,692	$1,421,960
May 1	Lisbon	Portugal	Estádio do Restelo	Ghost; Bokassa	39,931 / 39,931	$3,732,160
May 3	Madrid	Spain	Valdebebas	Ghost; Bokassa	69,897 / 70,000	$6,781,467
May 5	Barcelona	Spain	Estadi Olímpic Lluís Companys	Ghost; Bokassa	51,799 / 53,760	$5,285,919
May 8	Milan	Italy	SNAI San Siro Hippodrome	Ghost; Bokassa	47,427 / 47,500	$3,992,522
May 10	Zürich	Switzerland	Letzigrund	Ghost; Bokassa	46,349 / 47,226	$5,671,665
May 12	Paris	France	Stade de France	Ghost; Bokassa	74,889 / 76,183	$6,917,057
June 8	Slane	Ireland	Slane Castle	Ghost; Stiff Little Fingers; Bokassa; Fangclub	71,122 / 78,824	$8,194,075
June 11	Amsterdam	Netherlands	Johan Cruyff Arena	Ghost; Bokassa	50,576 / 50,576	$5,151,429
June 13	Cologne	Germany	RheinEnergieStadion	Ghost; Bokassa	41,460 / 42,021	$4,267,243
June 16	Brussels	Belgium	King Baudouin Stadium	Ghost; Bokassa	49,039 / 49,039	$5,243,080
June 18	Manchester	England	Etihad Stadium	Ghost; Bokassa	40,473 / 42,154	$4,510,011
June 20	London	England	Twickenham Stadium	Ghost; Bokassa	51,819 / 52,244	$6,080,657
July 6	Berlin	Germany	Olympiastadion	Ghost; Bokassa	68,452 / 68,452	$6,745,329
July 9	Gothenburg	Sweden	Ullevi	Ghost; Bokassa	63,348 / 63,348	$4,668,092
July 11	Copenhagen	Denmark	Telia Parken	Ghost; Bokassa	44,944 / 45,698	$4,811,332
July 13	Trondheim	Norway	Granåsen	Ghost; Bokassa	38,794 / 38,794	$4,348,793
July 16	Hämeenlinna	Finland	Kantolan Tapahtumapuisto	Ghost; Bokassa	55,519 / 55,519	$5,330,615
July 18	Tartu	Estonia	Raadi Airfield	Ghost; Bokassa	59,099 / 59,099	$4,791,241
July 21	Moscow	Russia	Luzhniki Stadium	Ghost; Bokassa	61,546 / 63,505	$6,073,606
August 14	Bucharest	Romania	Arena Națională	Ghost; Bokassa	48,725 / 48,800	$3,567,074
August 16	Vienna	Austria	Ernst-Happel-Stadion	Ghost; Bokassa	54,176 / 54,765	$5,347,522
August 18	Prague	Czech Republic	Letňany Airport	Ghost; Bokassa	73,555 / 73,658	$6,494,648
August 21	Warsaw	Poland	PGE Narodowy	Ghost; Bokassa	53,877 / 53,877	$4,829,962
August 23	Munich	Germany	Olympiastadion	Ghost; Bokassa	68,117 / 68,315	$6,805,574
August 25	Mannheim	Germany	Maimarktgelände	Ghost; Bokassa	64,017 / 64,045	$5,917,606
Total					4,198,613	$428,132,606

== Cancelled and postponed shows ==
List of cancelled concerts, showing date, city, country, venue and reason for cancellation
Date	City	Country	Venue	Reason
October 17, 2019	Perth	Australia	Optus Stadium	Cancelled due to Hetfield's recovery from addiction
October 20, 2019	Adelaide	Australia	Adelaide Oval	Cancelled due to Hetfield's recovery from addiction
October 22, 2019	Melbourne	Australia	Marvel Stadium	Cancelled due to Hetfield's recovery from addiction
October 24, 2019	Melbourne	Australia	Marvel Stadium	Cancelled due to Hetfield's recovery from addiction
October 26, 2019	Sydney	Australia	ANZ Stadium	Cancelled due to Hetfield's recovery from addiction
October 29, 2019	Brisbane	Australia	Queensland Sport and Athletics Centre	Cancelled due to Hetfield's recovery from addiction
October 31, 2019	Auckland	New Zealand	Mount Smart Stadium	Cancelled due to Hetfield's recovery from addiction
November 2, 2019	Auckland	New Zealand	Mount Smart Stadium	Cancelled due to Hetfield's recovery from addiction

== Personnel ==
- James Hetfield – lead vocals, rhythm guitar, acoustic guitar
- Lars Ulrich – drums
- Kirk Hammett – lead guitar, backing vocals
- Robert Trujillo – bass guitar, backing vocals
