= Hardwired (Metallica song) =

Single by Metallica

from the album Hardwired... to Self-Destruct
- Released: August 18, 2016
- Recorded: May 2016
- Studio: Metallica's HQ (San Rafael, California)
- Genre: Thrash metal
- Length: 3:11
- Label: Blackened
- Songwriters: James Hetfield; Lars Ulrich
- Producers: Greg Fidelman; Hetfield; Ulrich

Metallica singles chronology
"Lords of Summer" (2014)	"Hardwired" (2016)	"Moth into Flame" (2016)

Music video
- "Hardwired" on YouTube

"Hardwired" is a song by the American heavy metal band Metallica from their tenth studio album, Hardwired... to Self-Destruct (2016). It was released as the album's lead single on August 18, 2016. It was the last song made for the album, being written and recorded in four days by band members James Hetfield and Lars Ulrich. The two co-produced the song with Greg Fidelman. Its accompanying music video was directed by the band and Colin Hakes.

A thrash metal song, "Hardwired" is stylistically similar to Metallica's earliest songs. At three minutes long, it is one of their fastest and shortest songs. Its pessimistic lyrics center around the concept of a civilization consumed by paranoia, pain, and insanity. According to Ulrich, the songs meaning is how mistakes are inevitable and build who a person is, though the lyrics were also left open to interpretation. It has been interpreted as a song about 2016's political climate.

"Hardwired" was positively received from critics, who praised its composition, speed, and lyrics, although some criticized it for not being like the rest of the album. It received a nomination for Best Rock Song at the 59th Annual Grammy Awards, though lost to David Bowie's "Blackstar". It charted in several countries, reaching number one on the Billboard Mainstream Rock chart and number three on the UK Rock & Metal chart. It has been certified gold by the Australian Recording Industry Association, Pro-Música Brasil, and the Recording Industry Association of America. The band debuted the song live three days after its release and performed it during the WorldWired Tour and the M72 World Tour.

== Background and release ==
Metallica started working on their tenth studio album, Hardwired... to Self-Destruct, in September 2014. Writing and recording for the album took place at Metallica's HQ in San Rafael, California and went until May 2016, when Ulrich began reviewing the final track list. Initially, the band planned on using "Atlas, Rise!" as the album's opening track, which Ulrich took issue with. He began discussing the matter with fellow band member James Hetfield and album producer Greg Fidelman, believing that the album didn't have a proper open track. The band ultimately decided to make one final song to serve as an opener.

The creation of "Hardwired" took roughly four days, with writing and recording taking two days each. The band's approach towards writing the song differed from their usual strategy at the time. While the band normally went through several riffs they had previously made to create a song out of them, "Hardwired" was written from scratch. The song's working title was "Riff-Charged", although it was changed to "Hardwired" after Hetfield heard the phrase "hardwired to self-destruct" from a friend that was struggling with addiction. Hoping to give the song's "rhythmic foundation a different texture", Robert Trujillo chose to base his parts of the song around Ulrich's drumming, rather than follow Hetfield. Guitarist Kirk Hammett used a 1959 Gibson Les Paul guitar for his solo, which he described as being influenced by blues music. He further said that the song's opening was a "Robert Johnson lick that’s turned up".

Hardwired... to Self-Destruct, was formally announced on August 18, 2016, and released on November 18. It was published through the band's own record label, Blackened Recordings. The announcement in August coincided with the release of "Hardwired" as the album's lead single on the same day. Three days later, the song was debuted live at Metallica's performance in Minneapolis. The deluxe edition of Hardwired... to Self Destruct includes a recording of this performance. The song was later utilized as an opener for the band's WorldWired Tour, and was played during some performances of their M72 World Tour.

=== Music videos ===
The music video for "Hardwired" was released alongside the single. The clip was directed by the band and Colin Hakes, and filmed at the San Rafael High School in San Rafael, California. The clip, which is presented in black-and-white, features Metallica performing the song in the dark under rapidly flashing strobe lights, with the camera continuously rotating around the band members and rapidly cutting between different shots.

In promotion of the WorldWired tour, Metallica uploaded a music video for a live version of "Hardwired", titled "Hardwired... Around The World", on May 17, 2017. The clip features spliced together footage of different performances of "Hardwired" during the initial stops of the tour from August 2016 to February 2017, including those in New York City, Mexico City, and Seoul.

== Composition and lyrics ==
Musically, "Hardwired" is a thrash metal song played an average of 178 beats-per-minute, making it one of the band's fastest songs. At 3 minutes and 11 seconds long, it is also one of their shortest songs. The song's opening mainly uses an E5 power chord, described by Tom Wakenell of Distorted Sound Magazine as a "relentless E-string chug" that then goes into a "high speed thrash assault". The track's style is similar to Metallica's earlier work from the 1980s, with Chuck Armstrong of Loudwire, comparing it to the band's previous songs "Motorbreath", "Fight Fire With Fire", and "Damage, Inc." Joe DiVita, also writing for Loudwire, described the song as featuring "breakneck pace" and "fleet-fingered guitar fills". Dom Lawson of The Guardian described the song's riffs as "sharp and brutal".

The song's lyrics focus on the idea of a civilization consumed by paranoia, pain and insanity. It references ideas like righteous pain, a burning planet, and a "great destroyer", and the chorus of the track explicitly states "We're so fucked / Shit out of luck / Hardwired to self-destruct". The pessimistic themes established within the track continue throughout most of the album. Ulrich stated that the song's intended meaning was the belief that the choices a person makes are part of who they are, and some are destined to make mistakes as a result. However, he also stated that the meaning of the lyrics was intended to be ambiguous, and people could interpret it however they wanted. Some deemed "Hardwired" to be a statement on the geopolitical state of the world at the time; Chad Bowar of Loudwire claimed that the song's lyrics "resonate[d] with many" following the outcome of the 2016 United States presidential election.

== Critical reception ==
"Hardwired" was well received by critics. Armstrong stated that the song was a "perfect re-introduction" for Metallica that set high expectations for the rest of Hardwired... to Self-Destruct, and Lawson described it as the best track that the band had released in a long time, as well as a song that resolved many of the problems people felt their work over the past 25 years had. The editorial team of Spin ranked it as the 66th best song to release in 2016, with Taylor Berman stating that the song was "everything you'd hope to hear in a Metallica song, without any of the bloat dragging down their late period". The song was nominated for Best Rock Song at the 59th Annual Grammy Awards, though lost to David Bowie's "Blackstar". In a 2022 ranking of Metallica's discography, Rolling Stone ranked "Hardwired" as their 34th best song.

Several critics praised the song's composition and speed. Armstrong wrote that the song had a "near-perfect mix of heavy guitars, bass and drums, with a snare that snaps as hard as the song itself", while Lawson described the song's arrangement as "neatly to-the-point" and each of the band members' individual performances as "unfussy and precise". DiVita praised the song as "[cramming] a lot of action into just three minutes". Stephen Dalton of Louder described "Hardwired" as a "blast of machine-gun punk-metal", respectively. Adrien Begrand of PopMatters felt that it was a return to the sound of thrash metal that the band helped create in the past, highlighting Ulrich's double-time beats and Hetfield's rhythm guitar riffs.

The songs lyrics were mostly viewed positively, with some annotating their praise with their own interpretation of the lyrics; Begrand described it as "unfortunately, relevant" due to a "tumultuous year" that he felt the world had endured. The "aggression" present within the lyrics was praised, with the staff of NME describing "Hardwired" as "[grabbing] [the listener] by the throat with James Hetfield's frenetic Master Of Puppets-era thrash barks". Wakenell wrote that the song was a "flurry of impactful yet explicit" lyrics that displayed a tone of aggression that he felt recent Metallica songs were lacking. Lawson felt that the lyrics were effected by the "clumsy angst and faux rebellion" that had impacted Metallica's work since Load (1996), though believed that the composition made up for it.

Some felt that the song wasn't representative of other songs on the record. A writer of Metal Injection felt that the song was uncharacteristic of the rest of the album due to its speed, making it give off what they described as a "gimmicky vibe". They also felt that the song was "rudimentary". Vulture's Craig Jenkins described "Hardwired" as a "beautiful fake-out" that hinted towards a full return to Metallica's earlier work, only for the album to "inch it away with each slow, heavy, rude number that follows". Similarly, Brandon Stosuy of Spin believed that the "energy" present on "Hardwired" could have also been used on the rest of the album.

== Commercial performance ==
In the United States, "Hardwired" reached number 1 on the Billboard Mainstream Rock chart, number 9 on Hot Rock & Alternative Songs, and number 13 on Rock Airplay. It also appeared at number 19 on the Bubbling Under Hot 100 chart, and number 39 on the Digital Song Sales chart. On the year-end charts for Hot Rock & Alternative Songs, "Hardwired" appeared at number 65. In the United Kingdom, the song appeared at number 3 on the Rock & Metal chart and number 186 on the country's standard singles chart.

Elsewhere, "Hardwired" reached number 17 on both Canada Rock and Finland Download, and number 34 on the Mexico Ingles Airplay chart. It also reached number 70 in Australia, number 72 in Sweden, number 87 in Slovakia, and number 99 in the Czech Republic. "Hardwired" has been certified gold by the Australian Recording Industry Association, Pro-Música Brasil, and the Recording Industry Association of America.

== Personnel ==
Personnel taken from Hardwired... to Self-Destruct liner notes.

Metallica

- James Hetfield – guitar, vocals, production
- Lars Ulrich – drums, production
- Kirk Hammett – guitar
- Robert Trujillo – bass

Technical

- Greg Fidelman – production, recording, mixing
- Mike Gillies – additional recording
- Sara Lyn Killion – additional recording, assistant engineering
- Dan Monti – digital editing
- Jim Monti – digital editing
- Jason Gossman – digital editing
- Kent Matcke – assistant engineering
- Dave Collins – mastering

== Charts ==
=== Weekly charts ===
Weekly chart performance for "Hardwired"
Chart (2016)	Peak position
Australia (ARIA)	70
Belgium (Ultratip Bubbling Under Flanders)	15
Canada Digital Songs (Billboard)	32
Canada Rock (Billboard)	17
Czech Republic Singles Digital (ČNS IFPI)	99
Finland Download (Latauslista)	17
France (SNEP)	164
Mexico Ingles Airplay (Billboard)	34
Portugal (AFP)	51
Scotland Singles (Official Charts)	63
Slovakia Singles Digital (ČNS IFPI)	87
Sweden (Sverigetopplistan)	72
UK Singles (Official Charts)	186
UK Rock & Metal (Official Charts)	3
US Bubbling Under Hot 100 (Billboard)	19
US Digital Song Sales (Billboard)	39
US Hot Rock & Alternative Songs (Billboard)	9
US Mainstream Rock (Billboard)	1
US Rock & Alternative Airplay (Billboard)	13

=== Year-end charts ===
Year-end chart performance for "Hardwired"
Chart (2016)	Position
US Hot Rock & Alternative Songs (Billboard)	65
US Mainstream Rock (Billboard)	26

== Certifications ==
Certifications for "Hardwired"
Region	Certification	Certified units/sales
Australia (ARIA)	Gold	35,000^{‡}
Brazil (Pro-Música Brasil)	Gold	30,000^{‡}
United States (RIAA)	Gold	500,000^{‡}
^{‡} Sales+streaming figures based on certification alone.
