= Hardwired... to Self-Destruct =

Studio album by Metallica
- Released: November 18, 2016
- Recorded: May 2015 – August 2016
- Studio: Metallica's HQ (San Rafael, California)
- Genres: Heavy metal; thrash metal
- Length: 77:42
- Label: Blackened
- Producers: Greg Fidelman; James Hetfield; Lars Ulrich

Metallica chronology
Metallica: Through the Never (2013)	Hardwired... to Self-Destruct (2016)	S&M2 (2020)

Singles from Hardwired... to Self-Destruct
- 1. "Hardwired" Released: August 18, 2016; 2. "Moth into Flame" Released: September 26, 2016; 3. "Atlas, Rise!" Released: October 31, 2016; 4. "Now That We're Dead" Released: April 18, 2017; 5. "Spit Out the Bone" Released: November 14, 2017

Hardwired... to Self-Destruct is the tenth studio album by American heavy metal band Metallica, released as a double album on November 18, 2016, by the band's record label Blackened Recordings. It was Metallica's first studio album in eight years following Death Magnetic (2008), marking the longest gap between studio albums in the band's career, and its first studio album released through Blackened. The album was produced by Greg Fidelman, who engineered and mixed Death Magnetic.

Hardwired... to Self-Destruct was Metallica's sixth consecutive studio album to debut at number one on the U.S. Billboard 200, selling 291,000 album-equivalent units in its first week, and topping the charts in 57 countries. The number one ranking marked only the second time in the chart's history that any band had six consecutive albums debut at number one, following Dave Matthews Band. Hardwired... to Self-Destruct received generally positive reviews from critics.

== Background ==
In October 2011, bassist Robert Trujillo said that the band had returned to the studio to begin writing new material. He said: "The writing process for the new Metallica album has begun. We've been in the studio with Rick Rubin, working on a couple of things, and we're going to be recording during most of next year." In an interview with Classic Rock on January 8, 2013, Lars Ulrich said regarding the album, "What we're doing now certainly sounds like a continuation [of Death Magnetic]". He also said, "I love Rick [Rubin]. We all love Rick. We're in touch with Rick constantly. We'll see where it goes. It would stun me if the record came out in 2013." In a July 2013 interview, Ulrich told Ultimate Guitar, "2014 will be all about making a new Metallica record"; he said the album would most likely be released during 2015. Trujillo and Kirk Hammett later confirmed the band's intention to enter the studio.

In March 2014, Metallica began a tour called "Metallica By Request", in which fans requested songs for the band to perform, and a new song, titled "Lords of Summer", was written for the concerts and released as a "first take" demo in March 2014. A Black Friday exclusive single featuring the "First Pass Version" and a live version limited to 4,000 copies was released later that year on vinyl. In March 2015, Ulrich told Rolling Stone that twenty songs had been written for the album, and that he hoped some of them could be played at their shows later in the year. In October 2015, the band unveiled a new website with an introduction from Ulrich containing footage from the studio of the band working on new material. In November, Hammett said that the album was expected to be released in late 2016 or early 2017.

On February 6, 2016, during their "The Night Before" show at AT&T Park prior to Super Bowl 50, James Hetfield said that the band was nearing the end of the recording process, and Ulrich said that the album would be released soon. This was compounded by the band playing a new riff at the show, which ended up being from the song "Murder One". Ulrich further elaborated in March 2016, when he said that the band hoped to finish production of the album during the spring. "I think [2016] will be a pretty in-your-face year, at least the back half of it... hopefully we should be able to knock that on the head (finishing the album) this spring, I would guess". In March 2016, Hammett said that the band had worked with Greg Fidelman, who engineered and mixed Death Magnetic, as producer on the new album. "The title 'producer' itself is a bit ambiguous. It differs from person to person. You can call Rick Rubin a producer, but he's not the [same] type of producer as Bob Rock, who is there for every note. At the same time, Rick Rubin gets stuff done. Greg Fidelman is a different type of producer in that he's with the engineer always looking to try and move the project forward."

In April 2016, during the week leading up to Record Store Day, for which the band was its ambassador for 2016, Ulrich told Billboard that the band's expanded role within the music industry had played a part in the amount of time that it had taken to write and record the album. "The way we do things now is very different than the way we did things back in the days of Kill 'Em All and Ride the Lightning. Nowadays we like to do so many different things." Ulrich was also optimistic that production of the album had almost reached its completion. "Unless something radical happens it would be difficult for me to believe that it won't come out in 2016." In May 2016, Ulrich said in an interview with Metal Forces that the album would be released in the summer of 2016, and that details for the new album would be finalized in the next month. "If the record doesn't come out this year then it won't be because it's not done... it will be because there's some sort of cosmic reason that it would be smarter to hold onto it until next year. But the record will be done this summer". Recording of the album was completed in June 2016 once the recording for the song "Hardwired" was finished.

== Music ==
The lyrics follow a general theme of nihilism and pessimism. The title, "Hardwired... to Self-Destruct", came from an utterance Hetfield heard. "Somebody said to me the other day, and it stuck with me, 'Hardwired... Hardwired to Self-Destruct'. So it's like no matter what you do in your life you're really trying to not go down that path that you're maybe hard-wired to do." This theme unites disparate topics such as the dangers of fame on "Moth into Flame" and cosmicism in "Dream No More".

Hardwired... to Self-Destruct marks the first studio album by the band not to feature songwriting contributions from Hammett since their debut Kill 'Em All, which was written prior to him joining the group in 1983. In 2015, Hammett had lost his phone at Copenhagen Airport, which contained almost 250 riff ideas. Since Hammett did not back up the data, it affected his creative input for the new album and he "had to start at zero again while [Hetfield and Ulrich] had material for songs." Trujillo's sole writing credit on the album was the introduction to "ManUNkind", which he later said was written as a tribute to former Metallica bassist Cliff Burton. Trujillo also received a writing credit for "Lords of Summer", which was released on the album's deluxe edition. Regarding lyrical themes, Hardwired... to Self-Destruct bemoans the music industry on "Moth into Flame" and subjects such as drug addiction and overdose on "Hardwired." Familiar lyrics dealing with the H. P. Lovecraft Cthulhu Mythos are explored on "Dream No More", and "Murder One" is a tribute to the late Motörhead frontman Lemmy, who died in December 2015; the song was named after the bassist's favorite amplifier.

== Release and promotion ==
In a live Facebook event on August 18, 2016, Lars Ulrich said the album would be released in November 2016, and would contain twelve tracks. According to the announcement on the band's website, the CD version of the album would contain two discs with six tracks each, and that the album would contain nearly eighty minutes of new music. Metallica released the first single from the album, "Hardwired", that same day; those who pre-ordered the album through the band's official website received an instant download of the song. The album artwork, created by Herring & Herring, and the music video for "Hardwired" were also released. On September 15, 2016, the band announced that they had updated the track list for the deluxe edition of the album. In place of the thirteen "Riff Origins" songs that the band had initially included on the third disc, the band included "Ronnie Rising Medley", which the band had recorded for the Ronnie James Dio tribute album Ronnie James Dio – This Is Your Life in 2014, covers of Deep Purple's "When a Blind Man Cries" and Iron Maiden's "Remember Tomorrow", and remastered versions of the nine songs performed live at Record Store Day on April 16, 2016, along with a live version of "Hardwired".

On September 26, 2016, the band released the second single from the album, "Moth into Flame", along with a music video. The album's third single, "Atlas, Rise!", was released on October 31, 2016, with a music video composed of footage from the album's recording process. Ulrich also told The Straits Times that same day that the band would be filming music videos for all twelve tracks on the album, using YouTube as their platform. "Now that YouTube is the world's biggest television station, we figured we may as well knock a video out for every song... the practicality of shooting twelve music videos is kind of crazy, especially when you're trying to promote your record, and you're all over the place, and trying to make sure it doesn't leak. It's crazy but, at the same time, fun." On November 12, 2016, a local Walmart started selling the album in advance of the official release date of November 18. On November 16, the music videos for all nine remaining tracks (along with "Lords of Summer") were released. The Italian city of Matera appears in the music video for "Spit Out the Bone".

=== Tour ===
Metallica performing at MetLife Stadium in May 2017

Metallica promoted Hardwired... to Self-Destruct with the WorldWired Tour, which began in Puerto Rico on October 26, 2016, and concluded in Mannheim on August 25, 2019.

== Critical reception ==
Professional ratings
Aggregate scores
Source	Rating
AnyDecentMusic?	6.8/10
Metacritic	73/100
Review scores
Source	Rating
AllMusic	4/5 stars
The Chicago Tribune	2/4 stars
Classic Rock	3/5 stars
The Daily Telegraph	3/5 stars
The Guardian	4/5 stars
NME	4/5 stars
Pitchfork	6.5/10
PopMatters	8/10
Rolling Stone	4/5 stars
Sputnikmusic	3.5/5 stars

Hardwired... to Self-Destruct received generally positive reviews. The album received an average score of 73/100 from 29 reviews on Metacritic, indicating "generally favorable reviews". At AnyDecentMusic?, that collates critical reviews from more than 50 media sources, the album scored 6.8 points out of 10, based on 27 reviews.

AllMusic's Stephen Thomas Erlewine said although the album featured all of Metallica's core music elements, he thought the band did not sound as ferocious as it did in its '80s heyday. David Anthony of The A.V. Club had a mixed impression, saying "77 minutes of endless thrashing gets tiring" and thought the songs would benefit from leaner songwriting. He did, however, praise the album's first three singles, saying they were some of the best songs the band has written since the 1980s. Writing for Rolling Stone, David Fricke said Hardwired... to Self-Destruct reminded him of ...And Justice for All and Metallica, having the "jagged apocalypse" of the first and the "focused brawn" of the second.

Pitchfork's Zoe Camp also felt that the album was "an attempt to revisit their early days", similar to Death Magnetic, but adding that "the only difference is that this time they sound like they’re actually trying, and maybe even having a bit of fun". Greg Kot of The Chicago Tribune opined that Hardwired... to Self-Destruct was not comparable to Metallica's finest work, and predicted the album will be quickly forgotten as its promotional tour is done. Dom Lawson of The Guardian had an opposite opinion, declaring Hardwired... Metallica's "finest record in 25 years". He criticized the second disc for not being on the same level as the first, and stopped short of calling the album a classic.

Sputnikmusic's Trey Spencer wrote that, performance-wise, Hetfield's voice sounded reinvigorated, but complained on Ulrich's drumming for not "breaking a sweat" on most of the tracks. He concluded that Metallica was not attempting to recapture its trademark sound, but made this album "just for the love of playing". Stephen Dalton of Classic Rock said Metallica were still competent with the biggest pop stars in a climate where rock music was declining. Dalton liked the album's cover art, but his opinion on the music was "more mixed". Adrien Begrand of PopMatters complimented the band's concise songwriting and wise selection of songs for not including ballads and long instrumentals. He observed that Metallica was having fun again and made a record that will please old and new fans. Neil McCormick of The Daily Telegraph felt the album was "80 minutes of in-your-face shouty rage with absolutely no let-up", and that "if it was half as long, it would have been twice as effective".

=== Accolades ===
Year-end rankings for Hardwired... to Self-Destruct
Publication	Accolade	Rank
Kerrang!	50 Greatest Records of 2016	2
Loudwire	20 Best Metal Albums of 2016	5
PopMatters	The Best Metal of 2016	1
Revolver	20 Best Albums of 2016	1
Rolling Stone	20 Best Metal Albums of 2016	1
Rolling Stone	50 Best Albums of 2016	36
Rolling Stone	Readers' Poll: 10 Best Albums of 2016	3

Decade-end rankings for Hardwired... to Self-Destruct
Publication	Accolade	Rank
Discogs	The 200 Best Albums of the 2010s	22
Guitar World	20 Best Guitar Albums of the Decade	19
Kerrang!	The 75 Best Albums of the 2010s	32
Louder Sound	The 50 Best Metal Albums of the 2010s	6
Louder Sound	The 50 Best Rock Albums of the 2010s	23
MetalSucks	The 25 Best Metal Albums of 2010–2019	12
Revolver	25 Best Albums of the 2010s	13
Rolling Stone	100 Best Albums of the 2010s	85
Ultimate Classic Rock	Top 50 Classic Rock Albums of the '10s	25

=== Awards ===
Awards for Hardwired... to Self-Destruct
Year	Ceremony	Category	Result
2016	Revolver Music Awards	Album of the Year	Won
2016	Metal Storm Awards	Biggest Surprise	Won
2017	Planet Rock Awards	International Album	Won
2017	iHeartRadio Music Awards	Rock Album of the Year	Won
2017	Billboard Music Awards	Top Rock Album	Won
2017	Loudwire Music Awards	Metal Album of the Year	Nominated
2018	Grammy Awards	Best Rock Album	Nominated

== Commercial performance ==
Hardwired... to Self-Destruct debuted at number one on the Billboard 200, selling 291,000 album-equivalent units in its first week, of which 282,000 were pure album sales. The remaining 9,000 units comprised 34,000 song purchases and 9.3 million streams. It was the third-largest debut of the year in the US on pure sales, behind Drake's Views and Beyoncé's Lemonade. The album slipped to number 3 on the Billboard 200 in its second week, selling 75,000 units, including 71,000 copies. Hardwired... to Self-Destruct was the best selling heavy metal album of 2016 in the US and seventh overall, with 516,000 copies sold by the end of December. It became the highest selling debut of the year in Germany with more than 200,000 copies shipped in its first week, earning a platinum certification. Hardwired... to Self-Destruct had the biggest opening week of 2016 in Australia with 26,000 copies sold, debuting at number one on the ARIA chart. Overall, the album was number one in 57 countries, entered the top three in 75 nations and the top five in 105 countries.

On April 12, 2017, the album went platinum. Since July 7, 2017 the album officially sold more than 1,004,000 copies in the United States. The former No. 1 set is the band's 12th album to sell at least a million copies since Nielsen Music began tracking sales in 1991. The album earned gold certification in Netherlands on September 6, 2017. With 585,000 copies sold in the US during 2017, it finished as the country's ninth highest selling album of the year.

== Track listing ==
All tracks are written by James Hetfield and Lars Ulrich, except "ManUNkind", written by Hetfield, Ulrich and Robert Trujillo.

Disc one
No.	Title	Length
1.	"Hardwired"	3:10
2.	"Atlas, Rise!"	6:30
3.	"Now That We're Dead"	7:00
4.	"Moth into Flame"	5:50
5.	"Dream No More"	6:30
6.	"Halo on Fire"	8:15

Disc two
No.	Title	Length
7.	"Confusion"	6:43
8.	"ManUNkind"	6:55
9.	"Here Comes Revenge"	7:17
10.	"Am I Savage?"	6:30
11.	"Murder One"	5:45
12.	"Spit Out the Bone"	7:09
Total length:		77:42

=== Deluxe edition ===
Track 1 is a re-recorded version of the original demo, which was released in 2014, and is more than a minute shorter in length. Track 2 was recorded for the Ronnie James Dio tribute album Ronnie James Dio – This Is Your Life (2014). Track 3 was recorded for the Deep Purple tribute album Re-Machined: A Tribute to Deep Purple's Machine Head (2012). Track 4 was recorded for the Iron Maiden tribute album Maiden Heaven: A Tribute to Iron Maiden (2008). Tracks 5–13 were recorded live at Rasputin Music in Berkeley, California, on April 16, 2016, for Record Store Day. Track 14 was recorded live at U.S. Bank Stadium in Minneapolis, Minnesota, on August 20, 2016.

Disc three
No.	Title	Writer(s)	Length
1.	"Lords of Summer"	Hetfield; Ulrich; Trujillo	7:10
2.	"Ronnie Rising Medley (A Light in the Black / Tarot Woman / Stargazer / Kill the King)" (medley of Rainbow covers)	Ritchie Blackmore; Ronnie James Dio; Cozy Powell	9:03
3.	"When a Blind Man Cries" (Deep Purple cover)	Blackmore; Ian Gillan; Roger Glover; Jon Lord; Ian Paice	4:35
4.	"Remember Tomorrow" (Iron Maiden cover)	Steve Harris; Paul Di'Anno	5:50
5.	"Helpless (Live)" (Diamond Head cover)	Sean Harris; Brian Tatler	3:08
6.	"Hit the Lights (Live)"	Hetfield; Ulrich	4:07
7.	"The Four Horsemen (Live)"	Hetfield; Ulrich; Dave Mustaine	5:19
8.	"Ride the Lightning (Live)"	Hetfield; Ulrich; Cliff Burton; Mustaine	6:56
9.	"Fade to Black (Live)"	Hetfield; Ulrich; Burton; Kirk Hammett	7:24
10.	"Jump in the Fire (Live)"	Hetfield; Ulrich; Mustaine	5:13
11.	"For Whom the Bell Tolls (Live)"	Hetfield; Ulrich; Burton	4:32
12.	"Creeping Death (Live)"	Hetfield; Ulrich; Burton; Hammett	6:43
13.	"Metal Militia (Live)"	Hetfield; Ulrich; Mustaine	6:07
14.	"Hardwired (Live)"	Hetfield; Ulrich	3:30
Total length:			79:37

== Personnel ==
Personnel taken from Hardwired... to Self-Destruct liner notes.

Metallica

- James Hetfield – guitar, vocals, production
- Kirk Hammett – guitar
- Robert Trujillo – bass, backing vocals on "Dream No More"
- Lars Ulrich – drums, production

Production

- Greg Fidelman – production, recording, mixing
- Mike Gillies – additional recording
- Sara Lyn Killion – additional recording, assistant engineering
- Dan Monti – digital editing
- Jim Monti – digital editing
- Jason Gossman – digital editing
- Ken Matcke – assistant engineering
- Dave Collins – mastering
- Turner Duckworth – cover design
- Herring & Herring – photography, creative direction

== Charts ==
=== Weekly charts ===
Weekly chart performance for Hardwired... to Self-Destruct
Chart (2016)	Peak position
Argentine Albums (CAPIF)	1
Australian Albums (ARIA)	1
Austrian Albums (Ö3 Austria)	1
Belgian Albums (Ultratop Flanders)	1
Belgian Albums (Ultratop Wallonia)	1
Canadian Albums (Billboard)	1
Croatian International Albums (HDU)	1
Czech Albums (ČNS IFPI)	1
Danish Albums (Hitlisten)	1
Dutch Albums (Album Top 100)	1
Finnish Albums (Suomen virallinen lista)	1
French Albums (SNEP)	1
German Albums (Offizielle Top 100)	1
Greek Albums (IFPI)	1
Hungarian Albums (MAHASZ)	2
Irish Albums (IRMA)	1
Italian Albums (FIMI)	4
Japan Hot Albums (Billboard Japan)	7
Japanese Albums (Oricon)	5
Japanese International Albums (Oricon)	1
Mexican Albums (Top 100 Mexico)	1
New Zealand Albums (RMNZ)	1
Norwegian Albums (VG-lista)	1
Polish Albums (ZPAV)	1
Portuguese Albums (AFP)	1
Scottish Albums (Official Charts)	2
South Korean Albums (Circle)	31
South Korean International Albums (Circle)	1
Spanish Albums (Promusicae)	2
Swedish Albums (Sverigetopplistan)	1
Swiss Albums (Romandie)	1
Swiss Albums (Schweizer Hitparade)	1
UK Albums (Official Charts)	2
UK Rock & Metal Albums (Official Charts)	1
US Billboard 200	1
US Independent Albums (Billboard)	1
US Top Rock Albums (Billboard)	1
US Top Hard Rock Albums (Billboard)	1

=== Year-end charts ===
2016 year-end chart performance for Hardwired... to Self-Destruct
Chart (2016)	Position
Australian Albums (ARIA)	12
Austrian Albums (Ö3 Austria)	6
Belgian Albums (Ultratop Flanders)	8
Belgian Albums (Ultratop Wallonia)	33
Danish Albums (Hitlisten)	46
Dutch Albums (Album Top 100)	30
French Albums (SNEP)	47
German Albums (Offizielle Top 100)	3
Hungarian Albums (MAHASZ)	23
Icelandic Albums (Plötutíðindi)	92
Italian Albums (FIMI)	41
Mexican Albums (Top 100 Mexico)	4
New Zealand Albums (RMNZ)	24
Polish Albums (ZPAV)	2
South Korean International Albums (Gaon)	24
Spanish Albums (PROMUSICAE)	19
Swedish Albums (Sverigetopplistan)	43
Swiss Albums (Schweizer Hitparade)	10
UK Albums (OCC)	56
Worldwide Albums (IFPI)	4

2017 year-end chart performance for Hardwired... to Self-Destruct
Chart (2017)	Position
Australian Albums (ARIA)	93
Austrian Albums (Ö3 Austria)	68
Belgian Albums (Ultratop Flanders)	37
Belgian Albums (Ultratop Wallonia)	80
Canadian Albums (Billboard)	4
Danish Albums (Hitlisten)	99
German Albums (Offizielle Top 100)	50
Hungarian Albums (MAHASZ)	65
Mexican Albums (Top 100 Mexico)	1
Polish Albums (ZPAV)	38
Spanish Albums (PROMUSICAE)	35
Swiss Albums (Schweizer Hitparade)	23
US Billboard 200	12
US Top Rock Albums (Billboard)	1

2018 year-end chart performance for Hardwired... to Self-Destruct
Chart (2018)	Position
Portuguese Albums (AFP)	120
US Top Rock Albums (Billboard)	47

=== Decade-end charts ===
Decade-end chart performance for Hardwired... to Self-Destruct
Chart (2010–2019)	Position
US Billboard 200	158
US Top Rock Albums (Billboard)	32

== Certifications and sales ==
Sales certifications and numbers for Hardwired... to Self-Destruct
Region	Certification	Certified units/sales
Australia (ARIA)	Platinum	70,000^{‡}
Austria (IFPI Austria)	2× Platinum	30,000^{*}
Belgium (BRMA)	Platinum	30,000^{*}
Brazil (Pro-Música Brasil)	Gold	20,000^{‡}
Canada (Music Canada)	3× Platinum	240,000^{‡}
Czech Republic (IFPI Czech Republic)	Platinum	
Denmark (IFPI Danmark)	Platinum	20,000^{‡}
France (SNEP)	Platinum	100,000^{‡}
Germany (BVMI)	2× Platinum	400,000^{‡}
Hungary (MAHASZ)	Platinum	2,000^{^}
Italy (FIMI)	Gold	25,000^{*}
Mexico (AMPROFON)	3× Platinum	180,000^{‡}
Netherlands (NVPI)	Gold	20,000^{‡}
New Zealand (RMNZ)	Gold	7,500^{^}
Norway (IFPI Norway)	Gold	10,000^{‡}
Poland (ZPAV)	Diamond	100,000^{‡}
Portugal (AFP)	Gold	7,500^{^}
Romania (UFPR)	4× Platinum	100,000
South Korea (KMCA)	Gold	
Spain (Promusicae)	Gold	20,000^{‡}
Sweden (GLF)	Platinum	40,000^{‡}
Switzerland (IFPI Switzerland)	Platinum	20,000^{‡}
United Kingdom (BPI)	Gold	166,492
United States (RIAA)	Platinum	1,290,000
Summaries
Worldwide	—	2,100,000
^{*} Sales figures based on certification alone.^{^} Shipments figures based on certification alone.^{‡} Sales+streaming figures based on certification alone.
