= Moth into Flame =

Single by Metallica

from the album Hardwired... to Self-Destruct
- Released: September 26, 2016
- Genre: Heavy metal
- Length: 5:51
- Label: Blackened
- Songwriters: James Hetfield; Lars Ulrich
- Producers: Greg Fidelman; James Hetfield; Lars Ulrich

Metallica singles chronology
"Hardwired" (2016)	"Moth into Flame" (2016)	"Atlas, Rise!" (2016)

"Moth into Flame" is a song by the American heavy metal band Metallica from their tenth studio album, Hardwired... to Self-Destruct (2016). It was released as the album's second single on September 26, 2016. A heavy metal song, it was written by band members James Hetfield and Lars Ulrich, who also co-produced the song with Greg Fidelman. The lyrics are about drug abuse and fame, and were inspired by the life and death of singer Amy Winehouse. The song's music video was directed by Tom Kirk.

"Moth into Flame" was met with a positive response from critics, who praised its composition and sound. It has been included on critics' lists for Metallica's best songs. The song charted in multiple territories, reaching number eight on the UK Rock & Metal singles chart and number 15 on both the Billboard Hot Rock & Alternative Songs and Rock & Alternative Airplay charts in the United States.

"Moth into Flame" is the most played song from Hardwired... to Self-Destruct in Metallica's live shows, being played over 200 times by 2025. It has been played during the band's WorldWired Tour and the M72 World Tour, and is featured on the live album S&M2 (2020), a collaboration between Metallica and the San Francisco Symphony. At the 59th Annual Grammy Awards in 2017, Metallica performed the song as a duet with Lady Gaga, which was plagued by technical malfunctions.

== Background and release ==
Several years after releasing their previous studio album, Death Magnetic (2008), drummer Lars Ulrich confirmed in 2014 that the band was writing material for their next album, having been working on it "off and on" for about a year by that point. In February 2016, James Hetfield stated that the album was nearing completion, and Ulrich said that it would likely release later that year, which he restated in April.

The album, Hardwired... to Self-Destruct, was formally announced on August 18, and released on November 18. "Moth into Flame" is the album's fourth track. The album was released and published through the band's own record label, Blackened Recordings. "Moth into Flame" was released as the second single from the album on September 26. The music video for the song was directed by Tom Kirk. It cuts between clips of the band playing and one where moths fly around a CRT television.

== Production and music ==
"Moth into Flame" was written by Hetfield and Ulrich, who also produced the song alongside Greg Fidelman. The riffs for "Moth into Flame" were selected by Fidelman, Hetfield, and Ulrich from a selection of archived riffs the band had made in the past; Hetfield said that "Moth into Flame" got some of the archive's "A+ riffs".

"Moth into Flame" is a heavy metal song that is 5 minutes and 51 seconds long. It begins with a dual-guitar riff played by Hammett and Hetfield, with a hi-hat drum repeatedly played by Ulrich before the song's main riff begins. Lead guitarist Kirk Hammett has a solo on the track, and uses his ESP KH-2 M-II "The Mummy" guitar on it. The song features a variety of sounds reminiscent of other genres, shifting between moments described as thrash metal and hard rock. Joseph Schafer of Invisible Oranges said that the song's guitar harmonies were reminiscent of pop-punk music. Simon Young of Metal Hammer described Hetfield's vocal performance on the track as similar to "The Four Horsemen", a song from Metallica's debut record Kill 'Em All (1983). Schafer compared the guitar riffs and tones to their second album, Ride the Lightning (1984). Blabbermouth described "Moth into Flame" as a mix of all of the different sounds Metallica had pursued throughout their career, including "thrash bursts" and a merge of "moshing and rocking".

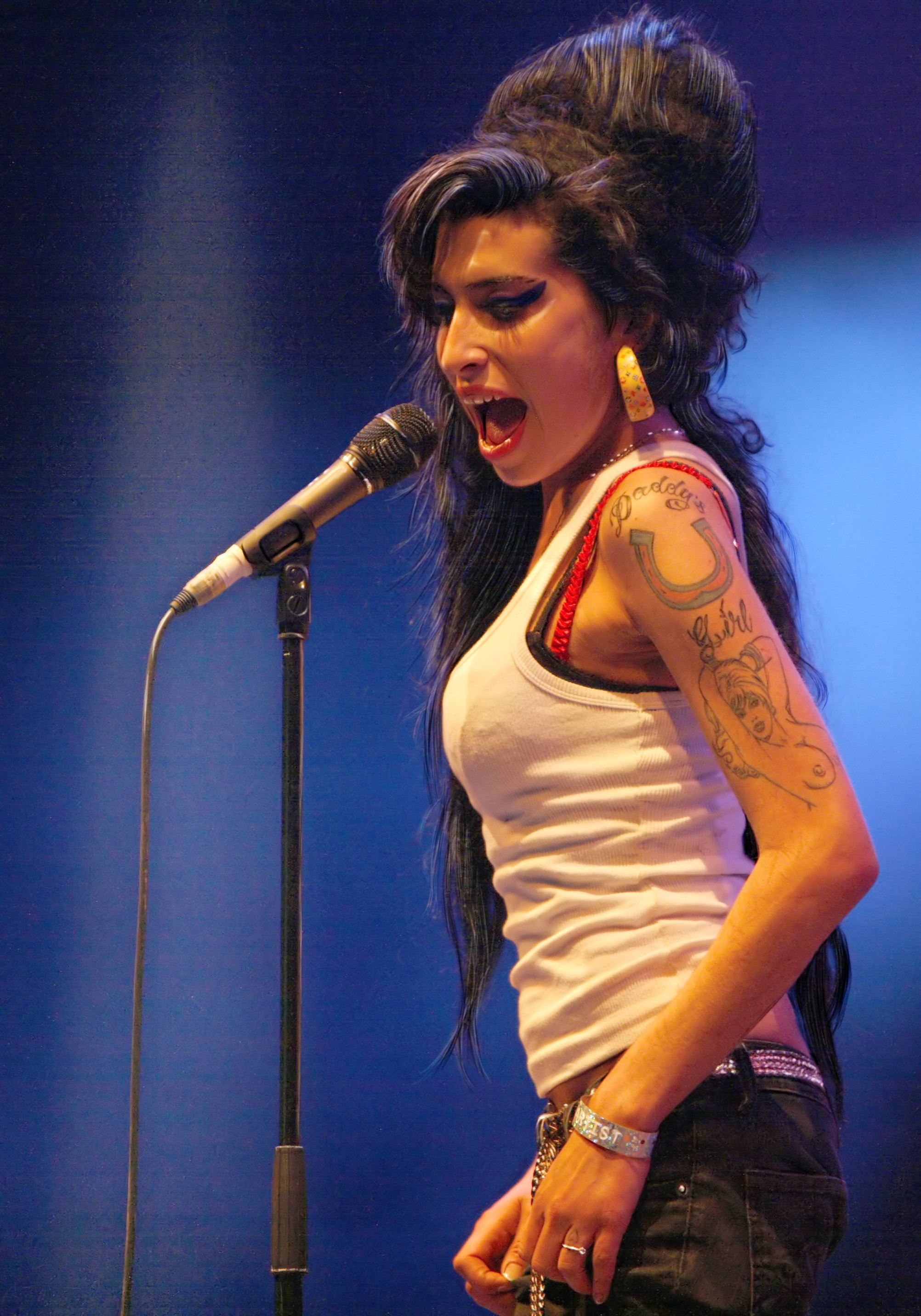
The life and death of Amy Winehouse (pictured in 2007) was Hetfield's inspiration for writing "Moth into Flame".

"Moth into Flame" is about drug abuse and fame. During the band's concert on November 1, 2017, in Antwerp, Hetfield introduced the song by saying "we’ve been playing music for 36-plus years, and we’ve seen a lot of people fall because of fame, chasing fame". According to Hetfield, the song was inspired by the life of the singer Amy Winehouse, and her battles with drug addiction and fame before her death in 2011. Hetfield was particularly inspired by a scene from the 2015 documentary Amy, where Winehouse is pursued by paparazzi when leaving her home. In an interview, Hetfield said the scene was "extremely saddening", seeing "how her life went from such a lively joyous person, to someone who was just trying to escape the reality of where she was".

== Critical reception ==
In his initial review of the single, Simon Young of Metal Hammer described "Moth into Flame" as well-executed compared to previous songs. He said that, while he thought Metallica had a tendency of "labouring a good idea into the ground", "Moth into Flame" was the band avoiding doing that by not staying on a single riff too long and featuring variety in its sound. He also said that the wait for the rest of Hardwired... to Self-Destruct to release would be "agonising". Joseph Schafer of Invisible Oranges praised the song upon its release, and compared it to preceding single "Hardwired". Schafer described the song as "both catchier and more complex", although criticized Hammett's solo and viewed the song's bass mix as hard to hear.

Reviewing Hardwired... to Self-Destruct, Blabbermouth praised the variety of sounds and the song's shift in tones, calling it a "whirling blender". NME said that the song had slower moments that allowed Hetfield and Hammett's dual guitar parts to "truly soar". Tom Wakenell of Distorted Sound Magazine called "Moth into Flame" a "perfectly structured song" and "arguably the strongest on the album", and said that it was a demonstration of Metallica at its finest, with "iconic riffs" and a catchy chorus.

Metal Hammer ranked "Moth into Flame" as Metallica's forty-fifth best song, calling it a "monstrous slab of authentic heavy metal" and as good as anything else that Metallica had released since 1991. They also ranked it fourth in a separate ranking of the best songs Metallica released in the 21st century, describing it "as solid modern heavy metal gets". Bryan Reesman of A.V. Club ranked it as Metallica's sixteenth best song, and the second-best song released in the 21st century, behind "The Day That Never Comes" (2008).

== Commercial performance ==
In North America, "Moth into Flame" reached number 15 on both the Billboard Hot Rock & Alternative Songs and Rock & Alternative Airplay charts in the United States. In Canada, it reached number 23 on Canada Rock, and 43 on the Canadian Digital Songs charts. It also reached number 32 on Mexico Ingles Airplay. In the United Kingdom, it charted at number eight on the UK Rock & Metal singles chart and 86 on the Scottish Singles Chart. Elsewhere in Europe, it reached number 15 in Hungary, number 91 in Sweden, and number 200 in France.

== Live performances ==
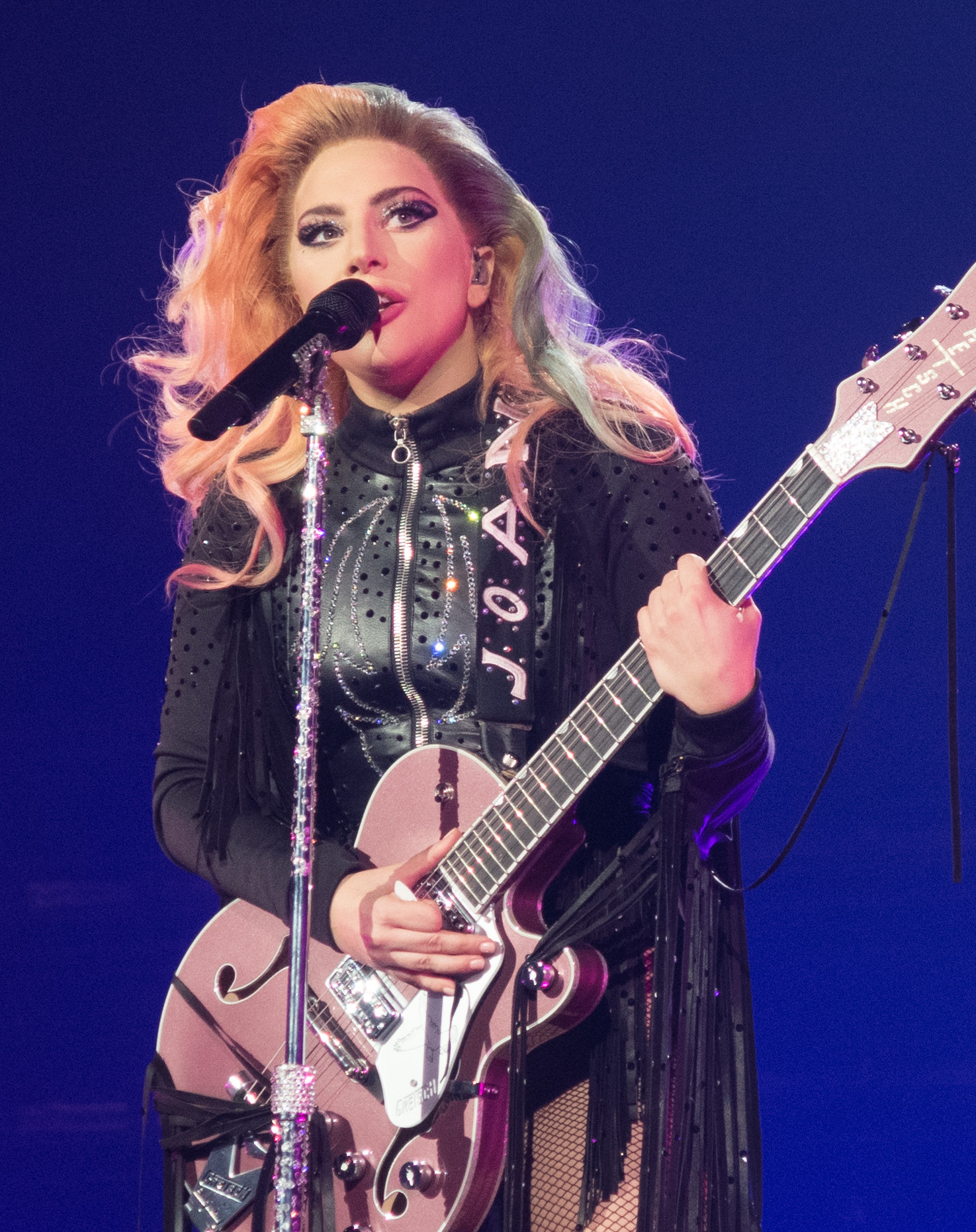
Lady Gaga (pictured in 2017) performed "Moth into Flame" with Metallica during the 59th Annual Grammy Awards.

"Moth into Flame" is the most performed song from Hardwired... to Self-Destruct at Metallica's live concerts. It was played live for the first time on September 27, 2016 at the band's performance at the Webster Hall. By March 2025, it was played live over 200 times. Concert tours that "Moth into Flame" was played live during include the WorldWired Tour and the M72 World Tour. The song was included on the set list for a 2019 concert collaboration between Metallica and the San Francisco Symphony, later released as the live album S&M2 (2020). The live recording of "Moth into Flame" was released prior to the album's release.

At the 59th Annual Grammy Awards in 2017, Metallica performed "Moth into Flame" as a duet with Lady Gaga. The collaboration came about when Gaga met Ulrich while the two were hanging out at Bradley Cooper's house, leading Gaga to go see Metallica live and describe them as playing "better than they’ve played in their whole lives". They began rehearsing for the performance the weekend prior to the ceremony. When they took the stage, Hetfield's microphone ended up getting unplugged–leaving Hetfield's vocals unheard by the audience for at least ninety seconds. Eventually, Hetfield and Gaga ended up sharing the working microphone for the remainder of the performance. Once the performance was done, Hetfield–who was still upset regarding the technical difficulties involving his mic, ended up kicking it over and threw his guitar off of the stage in anger. He later stated that the performance failure made him feel embarrassed and more angry than he had felt in a long time.

== Personnel ==
Adapted from the song's digital liner notes.

Metallica

- James Hetfield – guitar, vocals, production
- Lars Ulrich – drums, production
- Kirk Hammett – guitar
- Robert Trujillo – bass

Technical

- Greg Fidelman – production, recording, mixing
- Mike Gillies – additional recording
- Sara Lyn Killion – additional recording, assistant engineering
- Dan Monti – digital editing
- Jim Monti – digital editing
- Jason Gossman – digital editing
- Kent Matcke – assistant engineering
- Dave Collins – mastering

== Charts ==
Chart performance for "Moth into Flame"
Chart (2016)	Peak position
Canada Digital Songs (Billboard)	43
Canada Rock (Billboard)	23
France (SNEP)	200
Hungary (Single Top 40)	15
Mexico Ingles Airplay (Billboard)	32
Scotland (OCC)	86
Sweden (Sverigetopplistan)	91
UK Rock & Metal (OCC)	8
US Hot Rock & Alternative Songs (Billboard)	15
US Rock & Alternative Airplay (Billboard)	15
