= Now That We're Dead =

Single by Metallica

from the album Hardwired... to Self-Destruct
- Released: April 18, 2017
- Genre: Heavy metal
- Length: 6:59 (album version); 4:53 (radio edit)
- Label: Blackened
- Songwriters: James Hetfield; Lars Ulrich
- Producer: Greg Fidelman

Metallica singles chronology
"Atlas, Rise!" (2016)	"Now That We're Dead" (2017)	"Spit Out the Bone" (2017)

"Now That We're Dead" is a song by American heavy metal band Metallica and the fourth single from their tenth studio album, Hardwired... to Self-Destruct. The song was released as a single five months after the album's release, on April 18, 2017. The song made its live debut at Gocheok Sky Dome in Seoul on January 11, 2017, and was later played during The Late Show with Stephen Colbert on May 15, 2017.

== Music videos ==
The first music video directed by Herring & Herring and filmed at Be Electric Studios in Brooklyn, New York on September 22, 2016 and edited by Jeremiah Bruckart. It was released on November 16, 2016, The second music video was released on May 31, 2017, and was filmed in Mexico City by Brett Murray.

== In other media ==
The song was used as the entrance theme for WWE wrestler The Undertaker during the first night of WrestleMania 36 prior to his Boneyard Match against AJ Styles. The match was also The Undertaker's final match of his career, as he would then announce his retirement from in-ring competition at Survivor Series later in the year, which coincided with the 30th anniversary of his debut with the company. The song was also used in a video package celebrating his career which aired during the event.

In July 2020, WWE chairwoman Stephanie McMahon revealed that Metallica was originally scheduled to perform the song live at WrestleMania 36, which was to be held at Raymond James Stadium in Tampa, Florida, had the COVID-19 pandemic not forced WWE to hold the show behind closed doors. Raymond James Stadium hosted WrestleMania 37 the following year instead. Metallica did not make an appearance at WrestleMania 37.

== Personnel ==
- James Hetfield – guitar, vocals
- Kirk Hammett – guitar
- Robert Trujillo – bass
- Lars Ulrich – drums

== Charts ==
Chart performance for "Now That We're Dead"
Chart (2016–17)	Peak position
Belgium (Ultratip Bubbling Under Flanders)	48
Canada Rock (Billboard)	23
Sweden (Sverigetopplistan)	69
UK Rock & Metal (OCC)	10
US Hot Rock & Alternative Songs (Billboard)	28
US Mainstream Rock (Billboard)	2
US Rock & Alternative Airplay (Billboard)	16
