= Atlas, Rise! =

Single by Metallica

from the album Hardwired... to Self-Destruct
- Released: October 31, 2016
- Genre: Heavy metal
- Length: 6:31
- Label: Blackened
- Songwriters: James Hetfield; Lars Ulrich
- Producers: Greg Fidelman; James Hetfield; Lars Ulrich

Metallica singles chronology
"Moth into Flame" (2016)	"Atlas, Rise!" (2016)	"Now That We're Dead" (2017)

Music video
- "Atlas, Rise!" on YouTube

"Atlas, Rise!" is a song by heavy metal band Metallica, and the third single from their tenth studio album, Hardwired... to Self-Destruct. It was released on October 31, 2016. The song was nominated for Best Rock Song at the 60th Annual Grammy Awards.

== Promotion ==
"Atlas, Rise!" was released on October 31, 2016, and received a Halloween-themed promotion. The single's release was promoted with a limited-edition free Hardwired Halloween mask at participating record stores that contained a special download code to be able to access the track 30 minutes earlier than the full public release. It was performed live for the first time in Bogotá, Colombia, on November 1, 2016.

== Personnel ==
- James Hetfield – guitar, vocals
- Kirk Hammett – guitar
- Robert Trujillo – bass
- Lars Ulrich – drums

== Music video ==
Directed by Clark Eddy, the music video filmed at HQ in San Rafael, California by Jeff Yeager during the recording of Hardwired...To Self-Destruct. Video premiered on October 31, 2016.

== Charts ==
=== Weekly charts ===
Weekly chart performance for "Atlas, Rise!"
Chart (2016–2017)	Peak position
Belgium (Ultratip Bubbling Under Flanders)	40
Canada Rock (Billboard)	26
Czech Republic Singles Digital (ČNS IFPI)	93
Germany (GfK)	100
Hungary (Single Top 40)	29
Scotland Singles (OCC)	99
Sweden (Sverigetopplistan)	87
UK Rock & Metal (OCC)	7
US Hot Rock & Alternative Songs (Billboard)	15
US Mainstream Rock (Billboard)	1
US Rock & Alternative Airplay (Billboard)	12

=== Year-end charts ===
Year-end chart performance for "Atlas, Rise!"
Chart (2017)	Position
US Hot Rock Songs (Billboard)	72
US Mainstream Rock (Billboard)	12
US Rock Airplay (Billboard)	44
