= Ensemble librarianship =

Area of musical librarianship

Ensemble librarianship (or performance librarianship) is an area of music librarianship which specializes in serving the needs of musical ensembles, including symphony and chamber orchestras, opera houses, ballet companies, wind ensembles and educational institutions. Ensemble librarians acquire printed music and prepare it for performance.

== History ==
Ensemble or performance librarianship is a relatively new and evolving field with an oral history, so in many instances, there is no written history upon which to rely. Aside from a few surveys and recorded interviews, there are very few documents describing the history of the profession at this point in time. Historically, music librarians were only required to handle acquisitions and distribution—they did not have the requirements many librarians have today to mark individual parts for performance, correct errors, work in close consultation with the music director and/or artistic staff, and conduct scholarly research. Traditionally, many orchestra librarians were string players, since they already possessed a working knowledge of bowings (markings made in string parts). "Until 1970s, in all but the largest orchestras the librarian had a playing position in the orchestra and engaged in part time library work to supplement his or her income. In other cases the librarian had retired from playing and still wished to remain a part of the orchestra." A survey at the 1998 annual conference of the Major Orchestra Librarians' Association (MOLA) revealed that "in some smaller orchestras ..., the library position had remained part-time for the most part until the mid 1980s to early 1990s." In some organizations, librarian duties were alternatively fulfilled by an administrative staff member (i.e. personnel manager or orchestra manager) and this is still the case with many smaller organizations today. Gradually, particularly with the larger orchestras and bands, the role of music librarian has become a job obtained on an audition basis and which requires the demonstration of extensive knowledge of not only music notation, history, and performance practice, but also specialized technique and research ability. Today, larger and more established organizations can have multiple librarians and a hierarchy has developed, where a principal librarian is often identified and compensated accordingly (much like principal string or wind/brass/percussion players in an orchestral setting). This principal librarian may then work with one or more assistant librarians and can delegate tasks.

== Education ==
=== Formal education ===
A professional ensemble librarian requires a diverse and extensive musical, research, and often administrative-oriented background. Currently, there is no formal degree program specifically for ensemble or performance librarianship offered at any academic institution. Consequently, primary forms of training include degree programs or their equivalent in music performance (instrumental), music theory, musicology, or related fields, in conjunction with mentoring, internships, and on-the-job training. In the United States, work as an apprentice with a career librarian is a common and invaluable educational tool. Some ensemble librarians hold degrees in library science (LIS, MLIS). "Most music schools and many library / information science schools have programs that offer a variety of related course work which could be applied to orchestra librarianship." While such experience can be very helpful, this is not typically a specific requirement to work as an ensemble librarian. Ideally, "training for orchestra librarianship should include a broad and intensive education in all aspects of music and the liberal arts. This career requires a combination of formal education and extensive practical experience in a symphonic organization."

=== Required skills and abilities ===
==== Qualifications ====
Quoted with permission from Russ Girsberger's "A Manual for the Performance Library":

The following list describes the qualifications that are desirable to function successfully as a performance librarian. Not every position requires all of these abilities, but professional performance librarians use these skills on a regular basis in their work.

- Educational and musical qualifications
  - Degree in music or equivalent musical knowledge
  - Experience as a performing musician, preferably as a member of a large ensemble
  - Comprehensive knowledge of music theory, history, orchestration, transposition, and notation conventions
  - Detailed knowledge of ensemble repertoire and repertoire resources
  - Knowledge of the music industry, publishing, licensing, and copyright legislation
  - Library research skills and familiarity with standard reference resources
  - Bibliographic knowledge of European languages
- Computer and mechanical skills
  - Knowledge of necessary office equipment (photocopy machine, binding machine, etc.)
  - Knowledge of computer hardware and software, to include word processing, database, spreadsheet, and Internet applications
  - Experience with computer music notation software and/or facility with hand manuscript notation
- Personal characteristics
  - Ability to work effectively with conductors, musicians, administrators, faculty, staff, and students
  - Exceptional organizational skills and attention to detail
  - Ability to work independently and in a leadership role when necessary
  - Ability to handle multiple tasks concurrently
  - Project planning and time management skills
  - Excellent communication skills and ability to interact with a number of diverse constituencies
  - Self-motivated

==== Library auditions ====
In the U.S., some professional ensemble librarians must now endure a process similar to instrumental orchestral auditions in order to obtain their jobs. "Marcia Farabee (Principal Librarian, National Symphony) explains that today some orchestras have adopted a similar audition process for librarians. These 'librarian auditions' involve interviews as well as written tests which ask questions to which a qualified candidate should know the answers." Experience, formal education, and references provided on the auditionee's résumé play an important role, but the candidate may be required to pass this live audition and interview component, as well. As noted, larger orchestras and the more prestigious summer fellowships may require a candidate to pass a written exam demonstrating knowledge of composers, important historical facts, publishers, and repertoire. Librarians wishing to pursue this career study long hours in order to prepare for these auditions and therefore, professional ensemble librarianship is becoming a competitive field in North America. In Europe, many ensemble librarians currently obtain their positions via a more standard job interview process.

== Functions of the performance librarian ==
=== Music acquisition and cataloging ===
The ensemble librarian is often the primary individual responsible for research, acquisition (via purchase, rental, commission, or lending), receipt of materials, and cataloging of performing materials (scores and parts) for a musical organization. The librarian consults and collaborates with the music director, other artistic or administrative staff members, and/or soloists to identify the correct edition or version of the work to be acquired and its source, then works to determine its cost, delivery time, method of delivery, and any other associated concerns. The librarian may also be responsible for locating and obtaining perusal materials (scores and/or recordings for study). An important component of the acquisition process, particularly in the case of renting works under copyright, can be obtaining permission and licensing for any recording, broadcast (radio or World Wide Web), or other types of mechanical use that may be planned.

Following the purchase or commission of performance materials, the librarian may be obligated to create and/or maintain a catalog of the musical organization's physical holdings of performance and reference material. This can be as simple as an itemized listing of materials owned or as complex as designing and implementing a custom-made electronic catalog for the ensemble. Many organizations utilize pre-existing database programs such as OPAS. Upon receipt of purchased or donated materials, the librarian inventories the scores and parts, stamps or otherwise marks them with the organization's name and identifying information, and prepares them for storage. Cataloging can also extend to maintaining a record of conductor markings and dates of use, condition of materials, and performance and lending history.

=== Part preparation and distribution ===
The most essential task of the ensemble librarian is to provide adequately prepared parts to the players of the ensemble. Collaboration with conductors and soloists is often necessary in order to determine the specific requirements concerning the part preparation process. The goal is to ensure smooth flow of rehearsals and performances. Music arriving from a publisher or rental agent is rarely ready for use as such; most parts will need adjustments to make them more suitable for the performer. This most frequently includes marking string bowings, fixing bad page turns, adding and/or coordinating rehearsal figures, clarifying illegible notation and correcting errata. Editing of tempos, dynamics, articulations, inserts, and cuts or transposition into a singer's preferred vocal range or instrumentalist's preferred key may also be required. Additional proofreading may also be necessary, due to mistakes or inconsistencies in published editions.

Once the parts have been prepared appropriately, the orchestra librarian will assemble concert folders or arrange part pick-up for the musicians. The concert folder contains all the music for the complete concert for an individual musician (e.g. Oboe I) or a single desk of musicians (such as Violin I / Desk 1). Assembling the concert folders needs to be finished well in advance of each series of performances to make sure the musicians have time to practice. In some orchestras, the librarian is responsible for delivering concert folders to the music stands on stage for all rehearsals and performances.

Once the performances are over, the librarian disassembles the concert folders, tracks down any missing parts and stores any performance materials owned by the orchestra. Hired or rented sets are returned, and archival copies of bowings are usually made for future reference.

=== Preservation ===
The ensemble librarian is responsible for the care and preservation of the ensemble's music collection. In addition to the purchase cost of printed sheet music, the value of the library collection increases with information added during rehearsals and preparation work done to the parts. This value is inherent and often irreplaceable.

Damage to printed music may occur due to environmental sources (sunlight, temperature, humidity, pests, dust), physical handling, and improper storage. Appropriate humidity and temperature, protection from light sources (especially ultraviolet light) and from acid materials are key factors in ensuring the long life of printed music.

=== Auditions ===
One common recruitment process of musicians for professional orchestras and bands is an audition and the ensemble's librarian is often responsible for preparing the materials required for such auditions. These usually include a round consisting of excerpts from standard orchestral repertoire that the auditionee is required to perform for the audition committee. The orchestra librarian is usually in charge of preparing the audition materials for the auditionees and audition committee. Care must be taken that starts, stops, key and time signatures, tempo markings and transpositions are properly indicated. The librarian is often responsible for acquiring publishers' permissions for reproducing the audition excerpts of works still under [copyright].

=== Methods and tools ===
In the area of research, cataloging, storage and preservation of music, music libraries share many methods in common with ensemble libraries. Many ensemble librarians use a comprehensive computerized database such as OPAS that integrates information about the composer, instrumentation, and performance history of standard orchestral works.

Use of the internet has provided librarians easier access to information, especially research and reference materials. The online forum of the Major Orchestra Librarians' Association (MOLA) has greatly increased communication between professional librarians and provided excellent opportunities for networking and exchange of information.

The tools traditionally used for the part preparation process are very elementary: writing utensils (pencils of various graphite hardness, colored pencils, ink pens, felt tipped pens, electric and manual erasers, correction fluid and tape), office supplies (pencil sharpeners, staplers, staple removers, scissors, rulers, drafting templates, straight-edges, non-yellowing permanent and removable adhesive tapes, paper clips, packing tape, shipping materials, and property stamps). Typical office equipment found in an ensemble library includes a high quality photocopier capable of copying and printing paper of various sizes in duplex; papers of different sizes, colors and weights; binding machines (tape, coil, wire or comb); paper cutters; and computer(s) with word processing, spreadsheet, database and music notation software.

The part preparation process is traditionally done by hand for every single part to be used on stage. Bowings need to be marked into the string parts using pencil, since they are likely to change on stage during rehearsals, and the players need to be able to incorporate the alterations easily. The same applies to conductors' personal tempo indications and dynamic markings. Temporary musical edits (such as cuts and inserts) are done in a way which allows their easy removal afterward.

In addition to common library tools, ensemble librarians often utilize music engraving software for incorporating last-minute musical changes such as transpositions, "concert" endings, inserts or other musical edits to the performance material at hand.

On occasion, digital image processing software (such as Adobe Photoshop) is used for correcting errata and enhancing print quality of problematic performance materials of public domain musical works. Use of digital technology is becoming common in the task of preparing audition excerpts for the musician recruitment process.,

=== Administrative duties ===
In addition to the artistic roles ensemble librarians play within their organizations, many also manage duties that are administrative in nature. The administrative duties of an ensemble librarian differ depending on the type of musical organization for which the librarian works. The ensemble librarian's administrative tasks can range from control of the receipt and delivery of the performance materials to managing invoices and payments and creating an annual budget for the library; support for the program planning on issues related to instrumentation (music), off-stage music, different versions or editions, correct instrumentation. . .; providing assistance and support to the conductors, musicians, singers, choir, soloists and all professionals involved in concert production; managing the lending of musical materials to other institutions; providing additional notes or information for the printed concert program; coordinating the obtaining of rights for performance, recording or broadcast.

== Areas of practice ==
=== Symphony and chamber orchestras ===
Many ensemble librarians work in the field of symphony and chamber orchestras, forming the most typical professional profile of a performance librarian. Performance librarianship in professional symphony and chamber orchestras is characterized by frequently changing programs and a large total number of works performed, reflecting in the large number of performance materials and sets of parts to be prepared. Many full-time, professional, North American symphony orchestras employ two or even three music librarians (typically, a principal librarian and one or more assistant librarians). In Europe, full-sized symphony orchestras operate with fewer resources. For example, The Helsinki Philharmonic Orchestra, Finnish Radio Symphony Orchestra, and the Tampere Philharmonic Orchestra all are single-librarian orchestras.

The symphony orchestra librarian is in frequent contact with conductors and soloists to coordinate the editions and versions of works to be used, possible alterations or edits required, and their appropriate implementation. These can include cuts, inserts, supplemental rehearsal markings, transpositions and doublings. The librarian may also be involved in providing information to the orchestra administration for program planning purposes, such as information on the duration and instrumentation of the works in question, and any rental or purchase costs. This is essential information for the symphony orchestra repertoire planning process and the librarian can play an integral role.

=== Opera ===
The complexity of opera librarianship is due to the diversity and quantity of performance materials required (such as vocal scores, chorus scores, full scores, orchestral parts, off-stage parts), plus the sheer duration of operatic works makes the job a challenge. Opera productions are often subject to revision; occasionally sections of the music are skipped ("cuts" are made) or otherwise altered, and some excerpts may be transposed to a different key to accommodate the vocal range of the soloists. Several operas have different musical versions: different historical versions, versions sung in different languages or recent revisions made in editions of the work. Translations and transliterations may have to be inserted into the vocal scores, and most often this is organized by the librarian. In addition, as opera is a scenic art form, some musical considerations can develop due to the stage direction. Consequently, the librarian is in charge of implementing the necessary edits into the performance material provided by the opera library.

=== Ballet ===
Music in ballet is often subject to extensive revision, re-ordering and adaptation by the choreographer. This creates additional and varied duties for the ballet librarian, as opposed to the symphony or opera librarian. The choreography often requires cuts and sequence changes to the music, and therefore the librarian must be able to make the cuts logical and smooth in a musical sense. Knowledge of standard ballet repertoire and major ballet choreographers is necessary, since there are often several adaptations and arrangements of these works available.

=== Bands ===
The concert band or wind ensemble librarian's duties greatly resemble those of an orchestral performance librarian, but certain variations exist. For example, bands do not include the string sections for which orchestral librarians mark bowings into individual parts. A few examples of bands that might employ librarians are military bands, wind ensembles, brass bands, marching bands, jazz bands, ensembles at educational institutions, and popular music groups. The band librarian's work is greatly dependent on the performance venues and number of performances of the band—some military bands may perform in several ceremonies each day, and often a vast body of music must be ready to go on short notice. Marching, military, or brass bands may also perform in parades. In addition, many bands perform concerts on tour.

=== Educational institutions ===
Many top-level music schools and conservatories employ either professional and/or student ensemble librarians. Professionals often hold staff positions with the institution and job titles can range from "Music Librarian" to "Band Department Administrative Assistant" or "Orchestra Manager." In addition to performance librarian duties on par with professional organizations, educational institution positions often entail extensive administrative duties for the music department and personnel manager tasks, as well. Librarians in the university setting can oversee not only orchestras, bands, and choirs, but also wind or brass repertoire, conducting, and master classes; placement auditions; chamber music ensembles and more.

The work of an academic librarian can vary from that of a professional ensemble's librarian in many ways. For example, university ensembles tend to employ part rotation for educational purposes, whereas professional groups more often have one designated player per part or string seating position. Consequently, librarians at educational institutions must develop different types of part distribution systems than may be used at the professional level. In addition, the academic librarian may be obligated to coordinate greater circulation of materials to faculty, rotating and guest conductors, student recitals, and community organizations. This can present additional work to mark and re-mark parts each time they are to be used by the primary ensemble. Educational institutions may also provide significantly more practice parts and allow the check-out of parts much earlier by students in order to provide ample practice time, whereas professional musicians may not require this provision for as many of the scheduled works.

=== Music festivals ===
An alternative career or summer opportunity for the ensemble librarian is to work for a music festival, either professional or educational. Such positions are often part-time or seasonal and can afford the ensemble librarian with experience preparing different types of repertoire and working with different types of musicians. Various organizations compile and maintain listings of current classical music festivals, including professional music organizations such as the League of American Orchestras publication Symphony, university music departments such as the Juilliard School, and student organizations such as Sigma Alpha Iota. MOLA maintains a listing of summer festival job openings on their website.

== Professional organizations ==
For various reasons (such as the limited number of professionals in a particular geographical area, the dynamic scenario of working for a performing arts organization, and the lack of a formal academic degree program in the field), cooperation among professional ensemble librarians is not only helpful, but essential. International and national organizations facilitate the collaboration among ensemble library professionals and offer further opportunities for professional development and training.

The most notable organizations for ensemble librarians are:

- Major Orchestra Librarians' Association (MOLA): The Major Orchestra Librarians' Association, founded in 1983, is composed of nearly 250 professional performance organizations around the world, represented by more than 400 librarians. MOLA facilitates communication between professional performance librarians, educates and assists them in providing service to their organizations, provides support and resources to the performing arts, and works with publishers to achieve the highest standards in music performance materials for the professional musician. Today, MOLA's membership includes symphony orchestras, opera and ballet companies, music academies, professional bands and other types of ensembles worldwide.
- International Association of Music Libraries (IAML): Founded in 1951, the International Association of Music Libraries, Archives and Documentation Centres has around 2,000 individual and institutional members in around 45 countries. IAML works to promote international cooperation and to support the interests of the profession. It has national branches in 22 countries, five professional branches, four subject commissions and various working groups, and is responsible for several large-scale documentation projects. For the professional ensemble librarian, the Broadcasting and Orchestra Libraries Branch is the most essential of IAML's professional branches.

== Issues ==
An ongoing issue in discussion among ensemble or performance librarians is the adequacy of available performance materials, in comparison to today's needs and standards required for professional use. Therefore, challenges arise, such as the deterioration of materials only available on a rental basis, the need to meet the recommended requirements for editing music in terms of format, size, page turns, etc.; the problem of errata present in many editions; the delivery of materials in digital format (common in the case of direct distribution from composers to the user), from which the librarian must then create physical parts for performance; the quality of service provided by music publishers and the accessibility of the information they provide; the emergence of digital music stands and the associated changes such media may bring.

In addition to the typical concerns professional ensemble librarians face, another major issue is ensuring compliance with copyright laws. With the constant evolution of new technology, streaming performances on the Internet and other digital use of recorded music have become reality, and new forms of copyright-related questions therefore arise. For example, the performed work may be in the public domain where the orchestra originates, but may still be under copyright in some of the geographical areas where, for instance, a webcast may be accessible. The modern ensemble librarian is charged with the duty to self-educate regarding these new technological advances, in order to avoid violation of copyright law and to protect the organization for which they work.
