= M72 World Tour =

2023–27 concert tour by Metallica

- World tour by Metallica
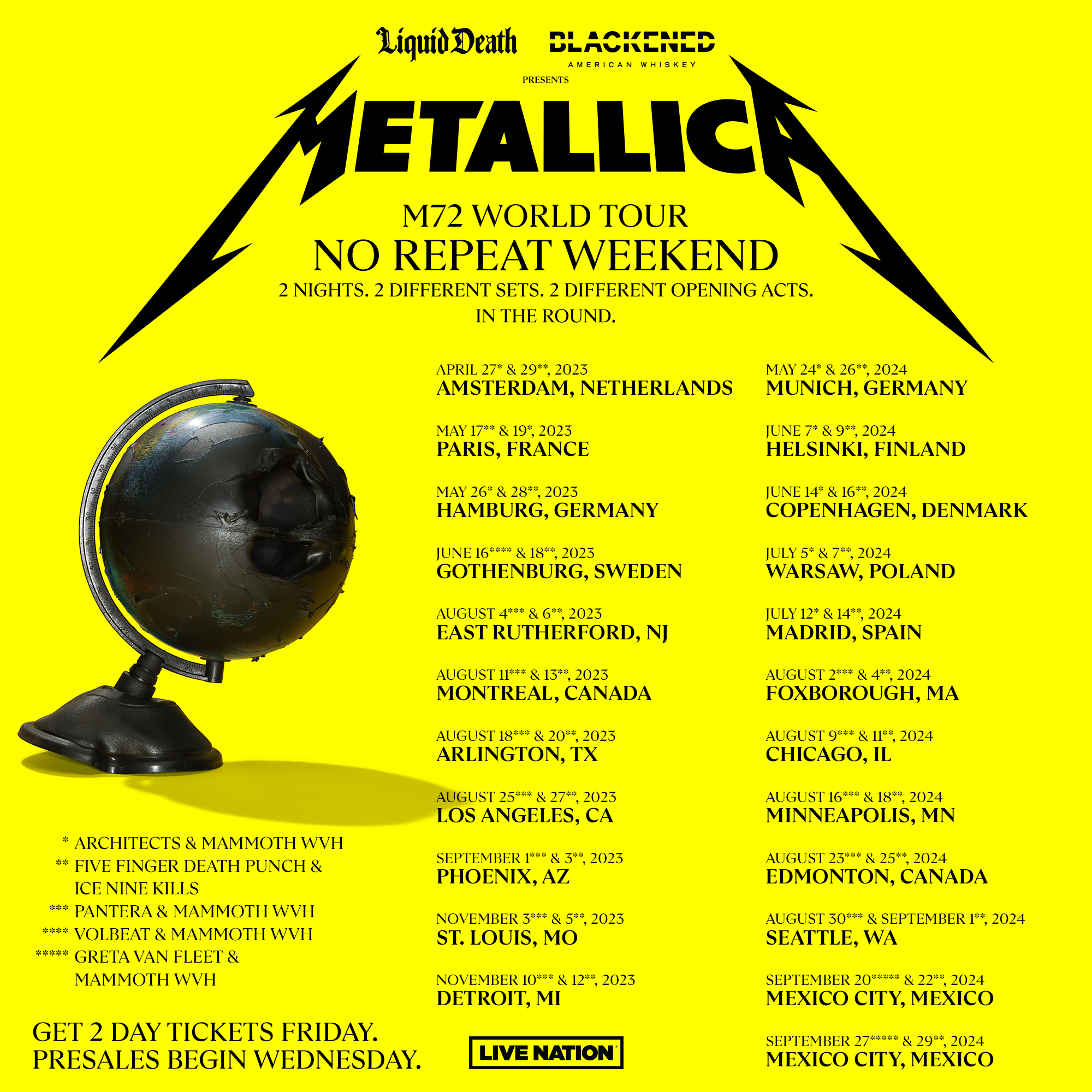
- Promotional poster for the tour
- Location: Asia; Europe; North America; Oceania
- Associated album: 72 Seasons
- Start date: April 27, 2023
- End date: June 19, 2027
- No. of shows: 111
- Supporting acts: Architects; Mammoth WVH; Floor Jansen; Ice Nine Kills; Epica; Five Finger Death Punch; Volbeat; Pantera; Suicidal Tendencies; Greta Van Fleet; Limp Bizkit; Evanescence; Avatar; Gojira; Knocked Loose
- Attendance: 5.32 million (86 shows)
- Box office: $668.4 million (86 shows)

Metallica concert chronology
- 2021–2022 tours; M72 World Tour (2023–2026); Life Burns Faster (2026–2027)
Life Burns Faster (2026–2027)	M72 World Tour (2027)

The M72 World Tour is a concert tour by the American heavy metal band Metallica in support of the band's eleventh studio album 72 Seasons, which was released on April 14, 2023. The tour was announced on November 28, 2022, following the release of the album's first single, "Lux Æterna". The tour began on April 27, 2023, in Amsterdam, and is set to conclude on June 19, 2027 in Salt Lake City. Along with an upgraded stage design which relocates the "Snake Pit" to the center stage, the majority of the tour saw the band performing two nights in each city, with each night featuring a different set list and opening acts.

The tour has grossed $668.4 million from 86 shows, with 5.32 million people in attendance, making it the 6th highest-grossing tour of the 2020s and 9th highest-grossing tour of all time. (Note: The band grossed $476 million from April 2023 to August 2025 (64 shows). They expanded the number with $41.5 million in November 2025 (6 shows), $72.6 million in May 2026 (7 shows), $57.1 million in June 2026 (7 shows) and $21.2 million in July 2026 (2 shows).)

== Background ==
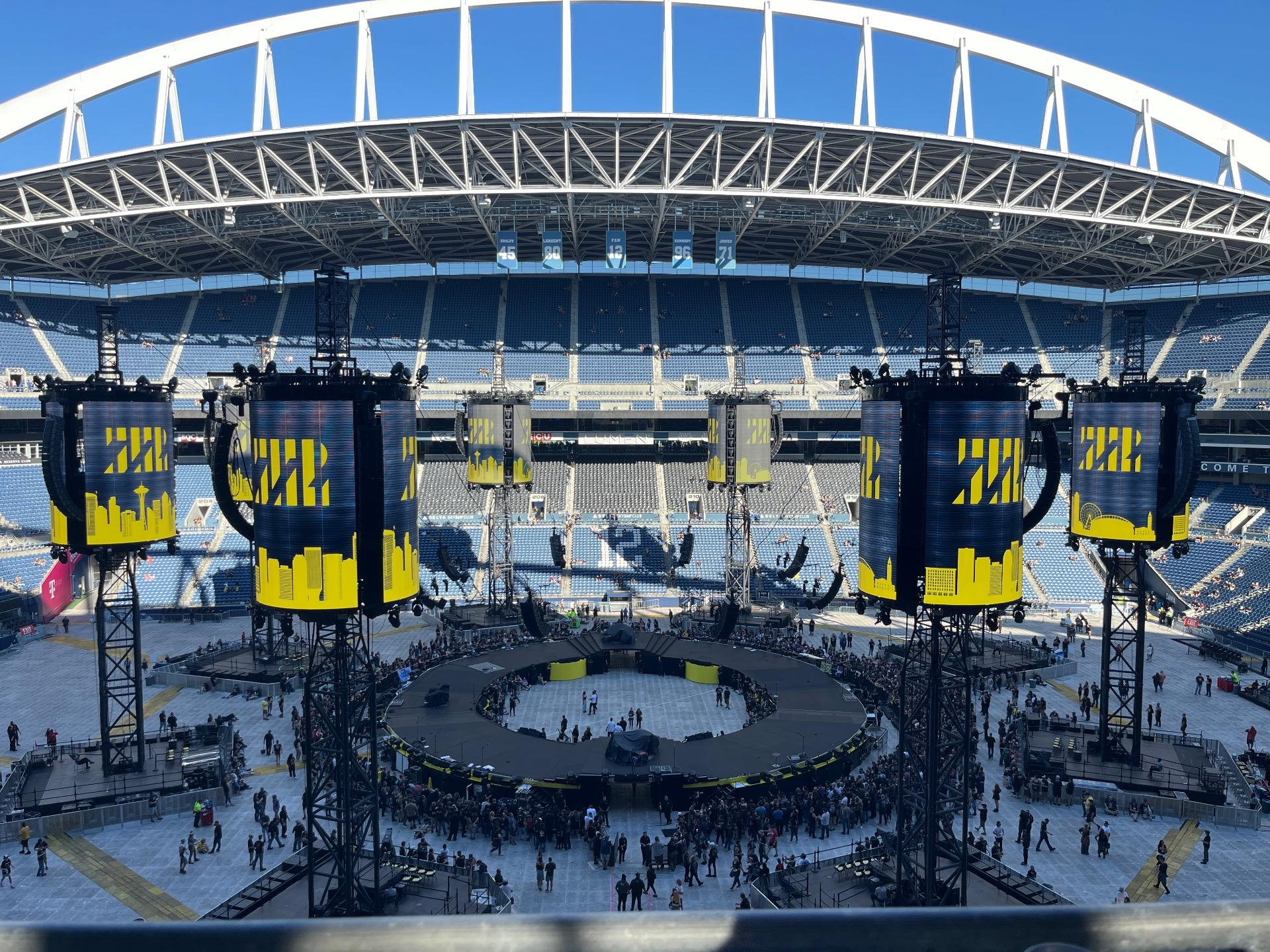
The stage design for the tour

On the announcement of the tour the band stated that, over the past few years, they had been inspired by the fans who attended their shows in 2019 and 2021. In the same statement they stated that they "had a blast being a part of the 2021 Wimmer Festivals when they played two nights in one city". Starting in April 2023, Metallica is set to visit twenty-two cities around the world and playing two nights in each city, with each being part of a "No Repeat Weekend" show which will feature two set lists which include deep cuts from the band's catalog. Two day tickets for each show went on sale on December 2, 2022, with single tickets being later made available to the general public on January 20, 2023.

Five Finger Death Punch were originally slated to support Metallica in the select 2023 European shows along with Ice Nine Kills, but pulled out due to lead vocalist Ivan Moody having to fully recover from complications from a recent hernia surgery. As a result, Five Finger Death Punch was replaced by Nightwish vocalist Floor Jansen in Amsterdam, and Dutch symphonic metal band Epica in Paris, Hamburg, and Gothenburg. In Inglewood, California on August 27, 2023, Moody was absent due to falling ill with the flu, and his vocal duties in Five Finger Death Punch were taken over and shared by Phil Labonte (All That Remains), Howard Jones (ex-Killswitch Engage, Light the Torch), and AJ Channer (Fire from the Gods) for the show. The September 1, 2023 performance in Glendale, Arizona was cut short by two songs due to James Hetfield suffering from vocal issues, and the band's following performance on September 3 in Glendale was postponed to September 9, 2023 after Hetfield had tested positive for COVID-19. Suicidal Tendencies replaced Ice Nine Kills as an opening act for the rescheduled Glendale performance.

The shows in Arlington, Texas on August 18 and August 20, 2023 were recorded and released in cinemas worldwide for one night only for each show (international screenings were shown a day later on August 19 and August 21 to suit local time zones).

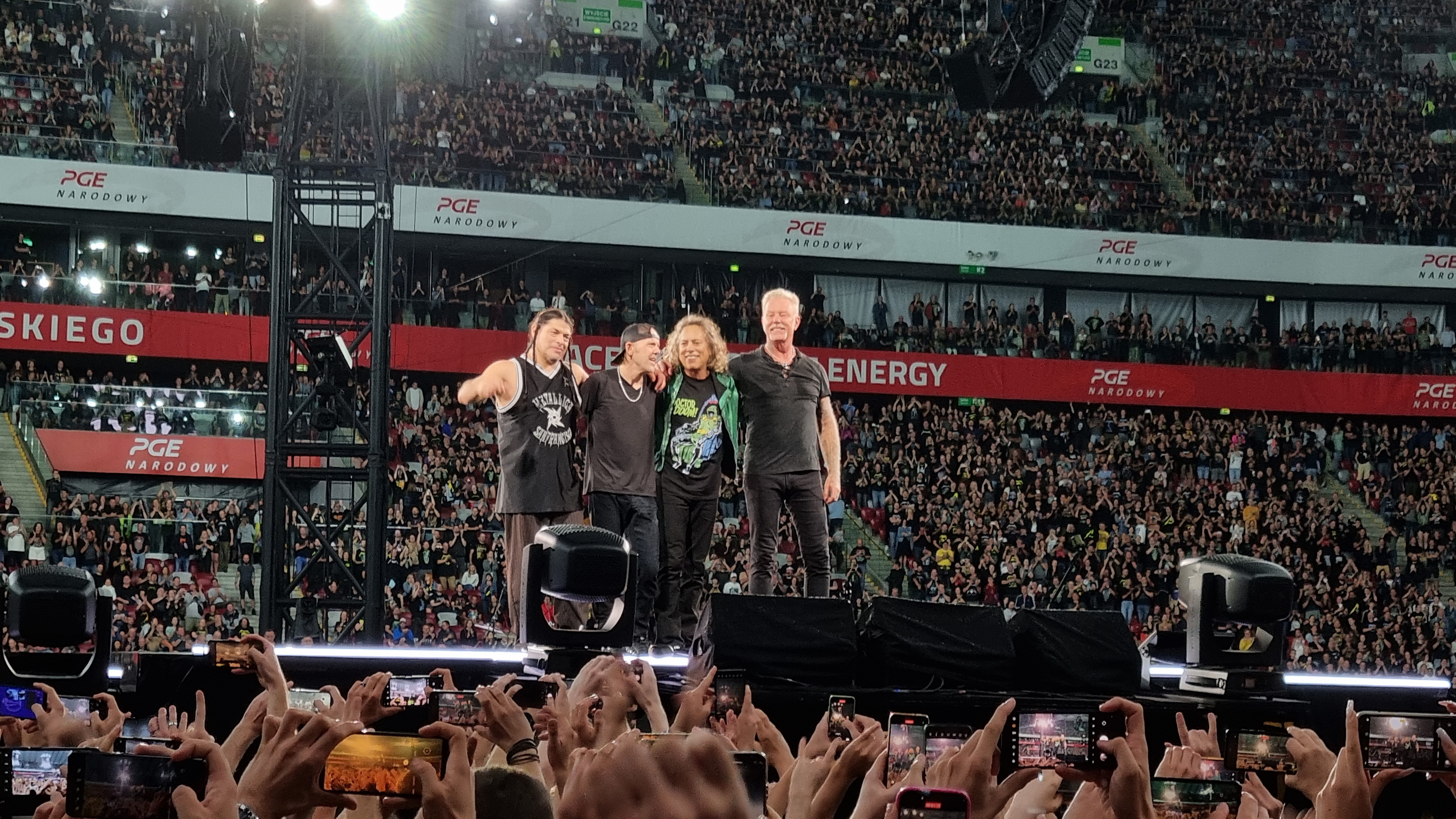
Metallica at the end of the concert in Warsaw, 2024

On November 15, 2023 Metallica announced two more European tour dates for 2024 in Milan and Oslo, with two additional tour dates to be announced later that month.

On the second night in Foxborough, Massachusetts on August 4, 2024, the show was delayed for 90 minutes due to a severe downpour and thunderstorms in the area. As a result, Ice Nine Kills' scheduled opening set was canceled, Five Finger Death Punch performed a shortened opening set, and Metallica ending up still performing a full show. On the fourth night in Mexico City on September 29, 2024, Five Finger Death Punch were unable to perform due to an injury Moody sustained at the Louder Than Life festival a few days prior when he accidentally fell onstage and suffered a fractured rib. As a result, Ice Nine Kills moved up to the special guest slot, and Mexican progressive metal band Agora joined the lineup for the show.

On September 19, 2024, Metallica announced a 2025 North American leg of stadium and festival dates with special guests Pantera, Limp Bizkit, Suicidal Tendencies, and Ice Nine Kills. An Oceania leg was shortly announced on October 23, 2024 for performances in November 2025 with Evanescence and Suicidal Tendencies as support acts.

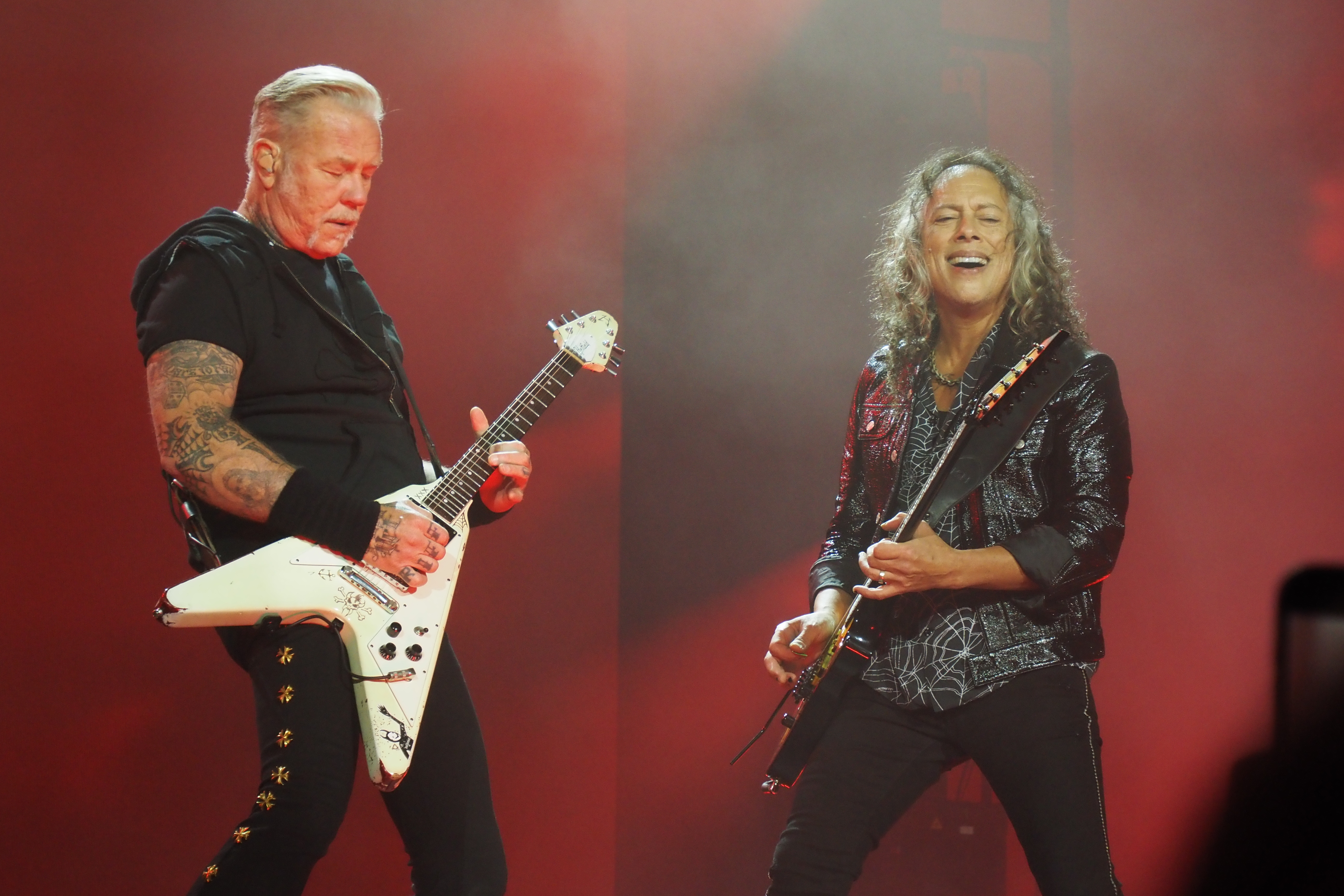
James Hetfield and Kirk Hammet performing in Melbourne, 2025

Metallica performed a sold out show at Virginia Tech's Lane Stadium on May 7, 2025. Their song "Enter Sandman" has been used as the football team's entrance to the stadium for twenty-five years. Metallica is the first band to perform a revenue producing concert at the stadium, as well as offering student seating for their show. The band's performance of "Enter Sandman," combined with the large crowd jumping and cheering, generated enough ground movement and tremors to be registered as a small earthquake by the Virginia Tech Seismological Observatory.

On May 22, 2025, Metallica announced a summer 2026 European stadium leg with Gojira, Pantera, Knocked Loose, and Avatar. Numerous attendance records were broken on that leg of the tour. Another North American leg of the tour with Limp Bizkit and Avatar, consisting of 12 stadium dates across Canada and United States in 2027, was announced the following year on September 16. These concerts take place after their Life Burns Faster residency at the Sphere in 2026 and 2027.

== Reception ==
The tour was met with positive reviews from music and entertainment critics. While having given the opening night performance in Amsterdam on April 27, 2023, 4 out of 5 stars, Ali Shutler of NME stated that Metallica was still the greatest heavy metal band around, while Eleanor Goodman from Metal Hammer who gave the performance that same night 5 out of 5 stars, affirmed that the band had thrown the world's biggest heavy metal party.

The tour won Rock Tour of the Year award at the 2024 Pollstar Awards and was the 9th highest grossing tour overall that year with $179,373,637.40 grossed from 24 shows. The tour was named Rock Tour of the Year once more in 2026 by Pollstar, the band also won Road Warrior of the Year award.

=== Attendance records ===
Key
†	Indicates a former attendance record

List of attendance records
Year	Dates	Venue	Region	Description	Ref.
2023	August 27	SoFi Stadium	United States	Highest attendance (78,000) †	
2023	November 3-5	The Dome at America's Center	United States	Highest two-show attendance (100,000)	
2024	June 7-9	Helsinki Olympic Stadium	Finland	Highest two-show attendance after reopening (105,000)	
2025	April 19	JMA Wireless Dome	United States	Highest attendance (47,500)	
2025	June 14	NRG Stadium	United States	Highest attendance (75,000)	
2025	June 27-29	Empower Field at Mile High	United States	Highest two-show attendance (152,000)	
2026	May 9	Olympic Stadium	Greece	Highest attendance (90,000)	
2026	May 13	Arena Națională	Romania	Highest attendance (65,000)	
2026	May 19	Silesian Stadium	Poland	Highest attendance (90,000)	
2026	May 22-24	Deutsche Bank Park	Germany	Highest attendance (62,000)	
2026	May 30	Olympiastadion	Germany	Highest attendance (95,000)	
2026	June 3	Stadio Renato Dall'Ara	Italy	Highest attendance (47,000)	
2026	June 11-13	Puskás Aréna	Hungary	Highest attendance (75,000)	
2026	June 11-13	Puskás Aréna	Hungary	Highest two-show attendance (150,000)	
2026	June 25	Hampden Park	Scotland	Highest attendance (58,000)	
2026	June 28	Principality Stadium	Wales	Highest attendance (76,000)	

== Set lists ==
=== No-Repeat Weekend sample set list ===
The following set lists were performed at the Johan Cruyff Arena on April 27 and 29, 2023 in Amsterdam, Netherlands, and are not intended to represent a majority of the shows throughout the tour.

Night One

1. "Orion"
2. "For Whom the Bell Tolls"
3. "Holier Than Thou"
4. "King Nothing"
5. "Lux Æterna"
6. "Screaming Suicide"
7. "Fade to Black"
8. "Sleepwalk My Life Away"
9. "Nothing Else Matters"
10. "Sad but True"
11. "The Day That Never Comes"
12. "Ride the Lightning"
13. "Battery"
14. "Fuel"
15. "Seek & Destroy"
16. "Master of Puppets"

Night Two

1. "The Call of Ktulu"
2. "Creeping Death"
3. "Leper Messiah"
4. "Until It Sleeps"
5. "72 Seasons"
6. "If Darkness Had a Son"
7. "Welcome Home (Sanitarium)"
8. "You Must Burn!"
9. "The Unforgiven"
10. "Wherever I May Roam"
11. "Harvester of Sorrow"
12. "Moth into Flame"
13. "Fight Fire with Fire"
14. "Whiskey in the Jar"
15. "One"
16. "Enter Sandman"

=== One-night sample set list ===
The following set list was performed at Lane Stadium in Blacksburg, Virginia on May 7, 2025. It is not intended to represent a majority of the shows throughout the tour.

1. "Creeping Death"
2. "For Whom The Bell Tolls"
3. "Ride the Lightning"
4. "King Nothing"
5. "Lux Æterna"
6. "Screaming Suicide"
7. "The Day That Never Comes"
8. "Fuel"
9. "Orion"
10. "Nothing Else Matters"
11. "Sad but True"
12. "One"
13. "Seek & Destroy"
14. "Master of Puppets"
15. "Enter Sandman"

== Tour dates ==
List of 2023 concerts, showing date, city, country, venue, opening act, tickets sold, number of available tickets and amount of gross revenue
Date (2023)	City	Country	Venue	Opening act	Attendance	Revenue
April 27	Amsterdam	Netherlands	Johan Cruyff Arena	Architects; Mammoth WVH	117,671 / 129,451	$10,691,363
April 29	Amsterdam	Netherlands	Johan Cruyff Arena	Floor Jansen; Ice Nine Kills	117,671 / 129,451	$10,691,363
May 17	Saint-Denis	France	Stade de France	Epica; Ice Nine Kills	96,376 / 115,310	$11,318,434
May 19	Saint-Denis	France	Stade de France	Architects; Mammoth WVH	96,376 / 115,310	$11,318,434
May 26	Hamburg	Germany	Volksparkstadion	Architects; Mammoth WVH	116,939 / 122,938	$11,520,569
May 28	Hamburg	Germany	Volksparkstadion	Epica; Ice Nine Kills	116,939 / 122,938	$11,520,569
June 8 (Note: The performances on June 8 and 10, 2023 were part of Download Festival.)	Castle Donington	England	Donington Park	—N/a	—N/a	—N/a
June 10	Castle Donington	England	Donington Park	—N/a	—N/a	—N/a
June 16	Gothenburg	Sweden	Ullevi	Volbeat; Mammoth WVH	110,429 / 128,436	$8,720,761
June 18	Gothenburg	Sweden	Ullevi	Epica; Ice Nine Kills	110,429 / 128,436	$8,720,761
August 4	East Rutherford	United States	MetLife Stadium	Pantera; Mammoth WVH	163,028 / 163,028	$20,848,071
August 6	East Rutherford	United States	MetLife Stadium	Five Finger Death Punch; Ice Nine Kills	163,028 / 163,028	$20,848,071
August 11	Montreal	Canada	Olympic Stadium	Pantera; Mammoth WVH	141,600 / 141,600	$12,661,757
August 13	Montreal	Canada	Olympic Stadium	Five Finger Death Punch; Ice Nine Kills	141,600 / 141,600	$12,661,757
August 18	Arlington	United States	AT&T Stadium	Pantera; Mammoth WVH	139,630 / 139,630	$18,524,712
August 20	Arlington	United States	AT&T Stadium	Five Finger Death Punch; Ice Nine Kills	139,630 / 139,630	$18,524,712
August 25	Inglewood	United States	SoFi Stadium	Pantera; Mammoth WVH	142,738 / 142,738	$17,508,000
August 27	Inglewood	United States	SoFi Stadium	Five Finger Death Punch; Ice Nine Kills	142,738 / 142,738	$17,508,000
September 1 (Note: The performance was cut short by two songs due to James Hetfield suffering from vocal issues during the show.)	Glendale	United States	State Farm Stadium	Pantera; Mammoth WVH	133,060 / 133,060	$14,013,497
September 9 (Note: The performance was originally scheduled to be on September 3, but was postponed due to James Hetfield testing positive for COVID-19.)	Glendale	United States	State Farm Stadium	Five Finger Death Punch; Suicidal Tendencies	133,060 / 133,060	$14,013,497
October 8 (Note: The performance on October 8, 2023 was part of Power Trip.)	Indio	United States	Empire Polo Club	—N/a	—N/a	—N/a
November 3	St. Louis	United States	The Dome at America's Center	Pantera; Mammoth WVH	112,286 / 112,286	$12,176,033
November 5	St. Louis	United States	The Dome at America's Center	Five Finger Death Punch; Ice Nine Kills	112,286 / 112,286	$12,176,033
November 10	Detroit	United States	Ford Field	Pantera; Mammoth WVH	128,779 / 128,779	$13,866,856
November 12	Detroit	United States	Ford Field	Five Finger Death Punch; Ice Nine Kills	128,779 / 128,779	$13,866,856
December 14 (Note: The performance on December 14, 2023 was a part of Soundstorm Festival.)	Riyadh	Saudi Arabia	Banban	—N/a	—N/a	—N/a

List of 2024 concerts, showing date, city, country, venue, opening act, tickets sold, number of available tickets and amount of gross revenue
Date (2024)	City	Country	Venue	Opening act	Attendance	Revenue
May 24	Munich	Germany	Olympiastadion	Architects; Mammoth WVH	155,791 / 155,791	$17,761,304
May 26	Munich	Germany	Olympiastadion	Five Finger Death Punch; Ice Nine Kills	155,791 / 155,791	$17,761,304
May 29 (Note: The performance on May 29, 2024 was part of I-Days Milano.)	Milan	Italy	Ippodromo La Maura	—N/a	—N/a	—N/a
June 1 (Note: The performance on June 1, 2024 was part of Racino Rocks.)	Ebreichsdorf	Austria	Magna Racino	—N/a	—N/a	—N/a
June 7	Helsinki	Finland	Helsinki Olympic Stadium	Architects; Mammoth WVH	104,836 / 104,836	$11,042,891
June 9	Helsinki	Finland	Helsinki Olympic Stadium	Five Finger Death Punch; Ice Nine Kills	104,836 / 104,836	$11,042,891
June 14	Copenhagen	Denmark	Parken Stadium	Architects; Mammoth WVH	86,235 / 86,235	$10,036,523
June 16	Copenhagen	Denmark	Parken Stadium	Five Finger Death Punch; Ice Nine Kills	86,235 / 86,235	$10,036,523
June 26 (Note: The performance on June 26, 2024 was part of Tons of Rock.)	Oslo	Norway	Ekebergsletta	—N/a	—N/a	—N/a
June 29 (Note: The performance on June 29, 2024 was part of Hellfest.)	Clisson	France	Val de Moine	—N/a	—N/a	—N/a
July 5	Warsaw	Poland	Stadion Narodowy	Architects; Mammoth WVH	154,258 / 154,258	$25,029,234
July 7	Warsaw	Poland	Stadion Narodowy	Five Finger Death Punch; Ice Nine Kills	154,258 / 154,258	$25,029,234
July 12	Madrid	Spain	Metropolitano Stadium	Architects; Mammoth WVH	123,697 / 123,697	$12,743,952
July 14	Madrid	Spain	Metropolitano Stadium	Five Finger Death Punch; Ice Nine Kills	123,697 / 123,697	$12,743,952
August 2	Foxborough	United States	Gillette Stadium	Pantera; Mammoth WVH	127,889 / 127,889	$16,791,826
August 4	Foxborough	United States	Gillette Stadium	Five Finger Death Punch	127,889 / 127,889	$16,791,826
August 9	Chicago	United States	Soldier Field	Pantera; Mammoth WVH	134,400 / 134,400	$16,328,255
August 11	Chicago	United States	Soldier Field	Five Finger Death Punch; Ice Nine Kills	134,400 / 134,400	$16,328,255
August 16	Minneapolis	United States	U.S. Bank Stadium	Pantera; Mammoth WVH	107,474 / 107,474	$12,014,211
August 18	Minneapolis	United States	U.S. Bank Stadium	Five Finger Death Punch; Ice Nine Kills	107,474 / 107,474	$12,014,211
August 23	Edmonton	Canada	Commonwealth Stadium	Pantera; Mammoth WVH	116,035 / 116,035	$12,672,187
August 25	Edmonton	Canada	Commonwealth Stadium	Five Finger Death Punch; Ice Nine Kills	116,035 / 116,035	$12,672,187
August 30	Seattle	United States	Lumen Field	Pantera; Mammoth WVH	135,722 / 135,722	$16,221,497
September 1	Seattle	United States	Lumen Field	Five Finger Death Punch; Ice Nine Kills	135,722 / 135,722	$16,221,497
September 20	Mexico City	Mexico	Estadio GNP Seguros	Greta Van Fleet; Mammoth WVH	254,370 / 254,370	$24,552,957
September 22	Mexico City	Mexico	Estadio GNP Seguros	Five Finger Death Punch; Ice Nine Kills	254,370 / 254,370	$24,552,957
September 27	Mexico City	Mexico	Estadio GNP Seguros	Greta Van Fleet; Mammoth WVH	254,370 / 254,370	$24,552,957
September 29	Mexico City	Mexico	Estadio GNP Seguros	Ice Nine Kills; Agora	254,370 / 254,370	$24,552,957

List of 2025 concerts, showing date, city, country, venue, opening act, tickets sold, number of available tickets and amount of gross revenue
Date (2025)	City	Country	Venue	Opening act	Attendance	Revenue
April 19	Syracuse	United States	JMA Wireless Dome	Pantera; Suicidal Tendencies	45,700 / 45,700	$6,500,000
April 24	Toronto	Canada	Rogers Centre	Pantera; Suicidal Tendencies	92,000 / 92,000	$12,000,000
April 26	Toronto	Canada	Rogers Centre	Limp Bizkit; Ice Nine Kills	92,000 / 92,000	$12,000,000
May 1	Nashville	United States	Nissan Stadium	Pantera; Suicidal Tendencies	81,400 / 81,400	$9,100,000
May 3	Nashville	United States	Nissan Stadium	Limp Bizkit; Ice Nine Kills	81,400 / 81,400	$9,100,000
May 7	Blacksburg	United States	Lane Stadium	Pantera; Suicidal Tendencies	66,900 / 66,900	$9,400,000
May 9 (Note: The performances on May 9 and 11, 2025 were part of Sonic Temple Festival.)	Columbus	United States	Historic Crew Stadium	—N/a	—N/a	—N/a
May 11	Columbus	United States	Historic Crew Stadium	—N/a	—N/a	—N/a
May 23	Philadelphia	United States	Lincoln Financial Field	Limp Bizkit; Ice Nine Kills	132,000 / 132,000	$14,600,000
May 25	Philadelphia	United States	Lincoln Financial Field	Pantera; Suicidal Tendencies	132,000 / 132,000	$14,600,000
May 28	Landover	United States	Northwest Stadium	Pantera; Suicidal Tendencies	60,000 / 67,617	$5,300,000
May 31	Charlotte	United States	Bank of America Stadium	Pantera; Suicidal Tendencies	76,100 / 76,100	$10,600,000
June 3	Atlanta	United States	Mercedes-Benz Stadium	Pantera; Suicidal Tendencies	56,100 / 56,100	$7,600,000
June 6	Tampa	United States	Raymond James Stadium	Limp Bizkit; Ice Nine Kills	133,000 / 133,000	$16,100,000
June 8	Tampa	United States	Raymond James Stadium	Pantera; Suicidal Tendencies	133,000 / 133,000	$16,100,000
June 14	Houston	United States	NRG Stadium	Pantera; Suicidal Tendencies	74,900 / 74,900	$11,800,000
June 20	Santa Clara	United States	Levi's Stadium	Limp Bizkit; Ice Nine Kills	112,000 / 112,000	$13,500,000
June 22	Santa Clara	United States	Levi's Stadium	Pantera; Suicidal Tendencies	112,000 / 112,000	$13,500,000
June 27	Denver	United States	Empower Field at Mile High	Limp Bizkit; Ice Nine Kills	152,000 / 152,000	$17,700,000
June 29	Denver	United States	Empower Field at Mile High	Pantera; Suicidal Tendencies	152,000 / 152,000	$17,700,000
November 1	Perth	Australia	Optus Stadium	Evanescence; Suicidal Tendencies	55,800 / 55,800	$7,000,000
November 5	Adelaide	Australia	Adelaide Oval	Evanescence; Suicidal Tendencies	46,600 / 46,600	$6,000,000
November 8	Melbourne	Australia	Marvel Stadium	Evanescence; Suicidal Tendencies	60,000 / 60,000	$7,300,000
November 12	Brisbane	Australia	Suncorp Stadium	Evanescence; Suicidal Tendencies	45,900 / 45,900	$6,300,000
November 15	Sydney	Australia	Accor Stadium	Evanescence; Suicidal Tendencies	71,800 / 71,800	$9,100,000
November 19	Auckland	New Zealand	Eden Park	Evanescence; Suicidal Tendencies	53,500 / 53,500	$5,800,000
November 30 (Note: The performance on November 30, 2025 was part of the after-race concerts at the Formula One Qatar Airways Qatar Grand Prix)	Lusail (Note: Labeled as Doha in promotional material.)	Qatar	Lusail International Circuit	—N/a	—N/a	—N/a
December 3	Sakhir	Bahrain	Al-Dana Amphitheatre	—N/a	—	—
December 6 (Note: The performance on December 6, 2025 was part of after-race concerts at the Formula One Etihad Airways Abu Dhabi Grand Prix.)	Abu Dhabi	United Arab Emirates	Etihad Park	—N/a	—N/a	—N/a

List of 2026 concerts, showing date, city, country, venue, opening act, tickets sold, number of available tickets and amount of gross revenue
Date (2026)	City	Country	Venue	Opening act	Attendance	Revenue
May 9	Athens	Greece	Olympic Stadium	Gojira; Knocked Loose	89,900 / 89,900	$11,300,000
May 13	Bucharest	Romania	Arena Națională	Gojira; Knocked Loose	62,800 / 62,800	$9,300,000
May 19	Chorzów	Poland	Silesian Stadium	Gojira; Knocked Loose	90,500 / 90,500	$14,400,000
May 22	Frankfurt	Germany	Deutsche Bank Park	Gojira; Knocked Loose	125,000 / 125,000	$15,500,000
May 24	Frankfurt	Germany	Deutsche Bank Park	Pantera; Avatar	125,000 / 125,000	$15,500,000
May 27	Zurich	Switzerland	Letzigrund	Gojira; Knocked Loose	44,300 / 44,300	$8,400,000
May 30	Berlin	Germany	Olympiastadion	Gojira; Knocked Loose	93,200 / 93,200	$13,700,000
June 3	Bologna	Italy	Stadio Renato Dall'Ara	Gojira; Knocked Loose	45,900 / 45,900	$6,300,000
June 11	Budapest	Hungary	Puskás Aréna	Pantera; Avatar	150,000 / 150,000	$19,700,000
June 13	Budapest	Hungary	Puskás Aréna	Gojira; Knocked Loose	150,000 / 150,000	$19,700,000
June 19	Dublin	Ireland	Aviva Stadium	Pantera; Avatar	101,000 / 101,000	$13,000,000
June 21	Dublin	Ireland	Aviva Stadium	Gojira; Knocked Loose	101,000 / 101,000	$13,000,000
June 25	Glasgow	Scotland	Hampden Park	Gojira; Knocked Loose	56,100 / 56,100	$8,200,000
June 28	Cardiff	Wales	Principality Stadium	Gojira; Knocked Loose	73,900 / 73,900	$9,900,000
July 3	London	England	London Stadium	Gojira; Knocked Loose	155,000 / 155,000	$21,200,000
July 5	London	England	London Stadium	Pantera; Avatar	155,000 / 155,000	$21,200,000

List of 2027 concerts, showing date, city, country, venue, opening act, tickets sold, number of available tickets and amount of gross revenue
Date (2027)	City	Country	Venue	Opening act	Attendance	Revenue
May 8	Vancouver	Canada	BC Place	Limp Bizkit; Avatar	—	—
May 13	San Diego	United States	Snapdragon Stadium	Limp Bizkit; Avatar	—	—
May 18	El Paso	United States	Sun Bowl Stadium	Limp Bizkit; Avatar	—	—
May 22	San Antonio	United States	Alamodome	Limp Bizkit; Avatar	—	—
May 26	Fayetteville	United States	Razorback Stadium	Limp Bizkit; Avatar	—	—
May 29	Kansas City	United States	Arrowhead Stadium	Limp Bizkit; Avatar	—	—
June 2	Raleigh	United States	Carter–Finley Stadium	Limp Bizkit; Avatar	—	—
June 5	Indianapolis	United States	Lucas Oil Stadium	Limp Bizkit; Avatar	—	—
June 8	Buffalo	United States	Highmark Stadium	Limp Bizkit; Avatar	—	—
June 12	Madison	United States	Camp Randall Stadium	Limp Bizkit; Avatar	—	—
June 15	Cleveland	United States	Huntington Bank Field	Limp Bizkit; Avatar	—	—
June 19	Salt Lake City	United States	Rice–Eccles Stadium	Limp Bizkit; Avatar	—	—
Total					5,386,443	$653,644,890

== Personnel ==
Metallica

- James Hetfield – lead vocals, rhythm guitar, acoustic guitar
- Lars Ulrich – drums
- Kirk Hammett – lead guitar, backing vocals
- Robert Trujillo – bass guitar, backing vocals
