= Life Burns Faster =

2026-27 concert residency by Metallica

- Residency by Metallica
- Promotional poster for the residency
- Location: Paradise, Nevada, U.S.
- Venue: Sphere
- Start date: October 1, 2026
- End date: March 13, 2027
- No. of shows: 24
- Producer: Live Nation

Metallica concert chronology
- M72 World Tour (2023–2026); Life Burns Faster (2026–2027); M72 World Tour (2027)

Life Burns Faster is an ongoing concert residency by the American heavy metal band Metallica that is taking place at Sphere in Paradise, Nevada, in the Las Vegas Valley. It consists of 24 shows, starting on October 1, 2026, and is set to conclude on March 13, 2027. Similarly to the M72 World Tour, two shows are performed back-to-back weekly with entirely different set lists.

== Background ==
Rumors of a Metallica concert residency at the Sphere began in 2025. In August 2025, drummer Lars Ulrich stated that the band was looking into performing at the venue after the conclusion of the M72 World Tour in 2026, but that nothing official had been signed. Bassist Robert Trujillo said that the band was discussing wanting to perform at the venue, feeling that the atmosphere of the venue would work well with the band's songs. In January 2026, The Sun reported that the band was "90 percent done" with negotiating the residency, with them having already met with technicians to begin planning out shows.

The residency was announced on February 25, 2026, with eight scheduled dates, then slated to begin on October 1, 2026, and end on October 31. Tickets for the residency were sold out within minutes on Ticketmaster, with a reported 300,000 people in the queue. Citing "unbelievable demand", Metallica announced the addition of six more shows on March 2, 2026, and another ten shows three days later, extending the residency into 2027.

On August 6, 2026, the band invited attendees to submit photos of themselves at previous Metallica concerts, to be projected onto the venue's screen. Fans can choose to upload photos for the day of the concert they are attending. The band opened a pop-up store at the Summit Showroom inside The Venetian Las Vegas on September 30, 2026.

== Reception ==
The residency was met with acclaim from critics, who lauded its scope and Metallica's performances. Giving a 4 out of 5 star review for the opening performance on October 1, 2026, Sam Hockley-Smith of The Guardian praised the visuals as "frequently overwhelming and occasionally awe-inspiring", adding that it did not distract from the band's performances. Kory Grow of Rolling Stone felt that Metallica had "perfected" the concert experience with the Sphere, declaring the visuals as "the true star of the show". Similarly, Melinda Sheckells of The Hollywood Reporter described the band's use of the venue as the "icing on the cake" to their discography. Dan Milam of Vice praised the band for performing songs that they had not played live in years, such as "...And Justice for All" and "Devil's Dance".

== Set list ==
The following set lists are from the October 1 and 3, 2026 concerts and are not intended to represent a majority of shows throughout the residency's run.

Night One

1. "Battery"
2. "Creeping Death"
3. "Now That We're Dead"
4. "Sad but True"
5. "The Shortest Straw"
6. "Wherever I May Roam"
7. "The Day That Never Comes"
8. "...And Justice for All"
9. "Nothing Else Matters"
10. "The Call of Ktulu"
11. "Lux Æterna"
12. "Ride the Lightning"
13. "The Memory Remains"
14. "Seek & Destroy"
15. "Master of Puppets"

Night Two

1. "Blackened"
2. "Fuel"
3. "Leper Messiah"
4. "Devil's Dance"
5. "72 Seasons"
6. "King Nothing"
7. "Welcome Home (Sanitarium)"
8. "The Outlaw Torn"
9. "The Unforgiven"
10. "Orion"
11. "Hardwired"
12. "Whiskey in the Jar"
13. "For Whom the Bell Tolls"
14. "One"
15. "Enter Sandman"

== Shows ==
List of 2026 concerts
Date (2026)	Attendance	Revenue
October 1	—	—
October 3	—	—
October 8	—	—
October 10	—	—
October 15	—	—
October 17	—	—
October 22	—	—
October 24	—	—
October 29	—	—
October 31	—	—
November 5	—	—
November 7	—	—

List of 2027 concerts
Date (2027)	Attendance	Revenue
January 28	—	—
January 30	—	—
February 4	—	—
February 6	—	—
February 18	—	—
February 20	—	—
February 25	—	—
February 27	—	—
March 4	—	—
March 6	—	—
March 11	—	—
March 13	—	—
