= Too Far Gone? =

2023 song by Metallica

Single by Metallica

from the album 72 Seasons
- Released: September 15, 2023
- Genre: Heavy metal
- Length: 4:33
- Label: Blackened
- Songwriters: James Hetfield; Lars Ulrich
- Producers: Greg Fidelman; Hetfield; Ulrich

Metallica singles chronology
"72 Seasons" (2023)	"Too Far Gone?" (2023)

Music video
- "Too Far Gone?" on YouTube

"Too Far Gone?" is a song by American heavy metal band Metallica that appears on their eleventh studio album, 72 Seasons. It peaked at No. 1 on the Billboard Mainstream Rock Airplay chart.

== Background and composition ==
Bassist Robert Trujillo said the song's riff had been around for some time and described it as having a New Wave of British Heavy Metal character and an old-school feel. Trujillo also described the song as a "travel song" that reminded him of being on tour. Lead guitarist Kirk Hammett described the arrangement as straightforward and said that he and James Hetfield performed a harmony solo. In an interview with Guitar Magazine discussing "If Darkness Had a Son" and "Too Far Gone?", Hammett said he preferred picking to hammer-ons and pull-offs because he felt it produced a richer, more aggressive sound. He said he had begun using more picking in his solos about three or four years before the interview and used it more often on 72 Seasons than on his previous albums. According to co-producer Greg Fidelman, the band called a section of the song the "Leper section" because it reminded them of "Leper Messiah".

Guitar World noted the E5-to-C5 chord progression, melodic chorus and frequent use of triplets in the rhythm-guitar parts.

== Lyrics ==
Brad Sanders of Stereogum linked the lyrics to the "one day at a time" mantra of 12-step programs, while Alexis Petridis of The Guardian connected the song with Alcoholics Anonymous's approach to recovery. Nick Ruskell of Kerrang! described the lyric "I am desperation / I am isolation" as an "unvarnished assertion".

== Reception ==
Kostas Alatas of Rock Hard compared the song's riff to Metallica's "No Remorse", described Hetfield's melodic vocal lines as reminiscent of the Misfits, and likened the harmonies near the end to Thin Lizzy. He also called the song catchy and said it became more appealing with repeated listens. Panos Drolias cited the grooves of "Shadows Follow" and "Too Far Gone?" as examples of the album's mid-tempo, guitar-driven approach. Yannis Savvidis compared the track to "The Struggle Within" and praised its chorus and Thin Lizzy-style harmonies.

Jacob Paul Nielsen of Magnet wrote that the harmonized guitar parts played by Hetfield and Hammett would not sound out of place on a Rainbow album. He described Hetfield's vocal melody as a "soaring melody of desperation and isolation". Nielsen wrote that he could hear a sold-out-stadium crowd singing along to the song and that Metallica had not put that "feel" on a record in decades. Kory Grow of Rolling Stone described its sound as punky and Misfits-influenced, with fluttering guitar attacks. Chuck Armstrong of Loudwire singled out "Too Far Gone?" as the best example of Hetfield's "newfound ferocity" on the album. Tom Carr of The Arts Desk described the song as having a punk groove and stuttering guitar chugs.

Adrien Begrand of PopMatters identified a resemblance between the song's riff and that of "Blitzkrieg" by Blitzkrieg, which Metallica covered in 1984. Dom Lawson of Blabbermouth.net called the track a potential sleeper hit, noting shades of Volbeat in the chorus and praising Hetfield's riffs. Sam Walker-Smart of Clash praised the song's riff and chorus, describing the latter as "disarmingly catchy", and noted that Hetfield uses his upper register during the chorus.

Greg Kennelty of Metal Injection wrote that the song stopped "about 20 BPM short of getting into thrash territory" and repeatedly approached a catchy chorus before dropping it. Alex Ventriglia of Metal Hammer Italia found the song not particularly convincing despite its relatively short runtime of four and a half minutes. He praised Hetfield's roaring, stentorian timbre but wrote that the song's attempts to gain speed became muddled. He regarded the song as another example of the album's unevenness. Gerrod Harris of The Spill Magazine argued that bridges and instrumental passages on several tracks, including "Too Far Gone?", added length without matching the impact of the choruses and opening riffs.

== Music video ==
The music video was directed by Team Rolfes and premiered on April 17, 2023. The video was part of a series made for every track on 72 Seasons, with each video featuring an American Sign Language (ASL) interpreter. A second music video was released on September 14, 2023. Directed by Coan "Buddy" Nichols, it features professional skateboarder Felipe Nunes alongside footage of Metallica performing at MetLife Stadium in East Rutherford, New Jersey, on August 6, 2023. Nunes said the video included footage from his personal archive of his skateboarding tricks over time, as well as previously unseen footage of him skating through the streets of São Paulo. The original music video was animated, unlike the second video.

== Live performances ==
The band performed "Too Far Gone?" live for the first time on August 6, 2023, at MetLife Stadium during the M72 World Tour.

A live recording titled "Too Far Gone? (Live From MetLife Stadium, East Rutherford, NJ - August 6, 2023)" was released as a digital single on September 15, 2023.

== Track listing ==
"Too Far Gone? (Live at MetLife Stadium, East Rutherford, NJ - August 6, 2023)" single
No.	Title	Length
1.	"Too Far Gone?" (Live at MetLife Stadium, East Rutherford, NJ - August 6, 2023)	4:48
2.	"Too Far Gone?"	4:33
Total length:		9:21

== Personnel ==
Credits adapted from Apple Music.

Metallica

- James Hetfield – guitar, vocals, production
- Lars Ulrich – drums, production
- Kirk Hammett – guitar
- Robert Trujillo – bass, backing vocals (track 1)

Production

- Greg Fidelman – production, mixing
- Jim Monti – engineering
- Sara Lyn Killion – engineering
- Jason Gossman – editing, additional engineering
- Dan Monti – editing
- Kent Matcke – assistant engineering
- Bob Ludwig – mastering

== Chart performance ==
"Too Far Gone?" reached number one on the Billboard Mainstream Rock Airplay chart dated November 4, 2023, becoming the band's 13th number-one song on the chart and the third from 72 Seasons.

=== Weekly charts ===
Weekly chart performance for "Too Far Gone?"
Chart (2023)	Peak position
Canada Rock (Billboard)	21
Italy (EarOne Airplay Chart)	66
US Hot Rock & Alternative Songs (Billboard)	38
US Rock & Alternative Airplay (Billboard)	6
US Mainstream Rock Airplay (Billboard)	1

=== Year-end charts ===
Year-end chart performance for "Too Far Gone?"
Chart (2023)	Position
US Mainstream Rock Airplay (Billboard)	44
