= Beppe Devalle =

Italian painter (1940–2013)

- Born: Giuseppe Riccardo Devalle; 8 April 1940; Turin, Italy
- Died: 4 February 2013 (aged 72); Milan, Italy
- Education: Accademia Albertina
- Known for: Painting, photocollage, photomontage

Giuseppe Riccardo "Beppe" Devalle (8 April 1940 – 4 February 2013) was an Italian painter and collagist, acknowledged as one of the most interesting and highly appreciated artists of the last few decades of Italian painting. He always refuted the prevailing trends of the day so as to create and distinguish his own individual style: this may explain why Devalle has often been overlooked and placed as something of an outsider. He has been known as a master of photomontage and defined as a creator of the 'New Epic Italian style'.

== Early life and experiences ==
Devalle was born in Turin on 8 April 1940. During the war his family first evacuated to Cherasco, the birthplace of his paternal grandparents, and then to Lanzo Torinese, from 1943 to 1945. On returning to Turin in 1945, he attended elementary and then secondary school without much enthusiasm. In 1955 he was admitted to the Liceo Artistico dell'Accademia Albertina, after having studied all summer with the Casoni brothers, on the advice of Felice Casorati, whom he had met through common friends of his parents. During the years of his attendance at the Liceo, he came in contact with the avant-garde world of contemporary art, thanks to his acquaintance with sculptors, Sandro Cherchi and Franco Garelli. He frequented the USIS Library in Turin, and in 1958 he went to the PAC in Milan, to see the exhibition of American painting; a visit which marked the beginning of his interest in Gorky and particularly in abstract expressionism.

In 1958 he was admitted to the annual Promotrice delle Belle Arti in Turin. He completed his diploma at the Liceo and then, for a few years, worked as a cost estimator in his father's firm, which specialised in metal structural work. At the same time, he enrolled in the Accademia Albertina, taking a course in stage design. The first outcome of this decision was his coming into contact with the thinking and aesthetics of contemporary theatre (Beckett, Ionesco, Albee, etc.).

== Career ==
=== Beginnings 1961–1972 ===
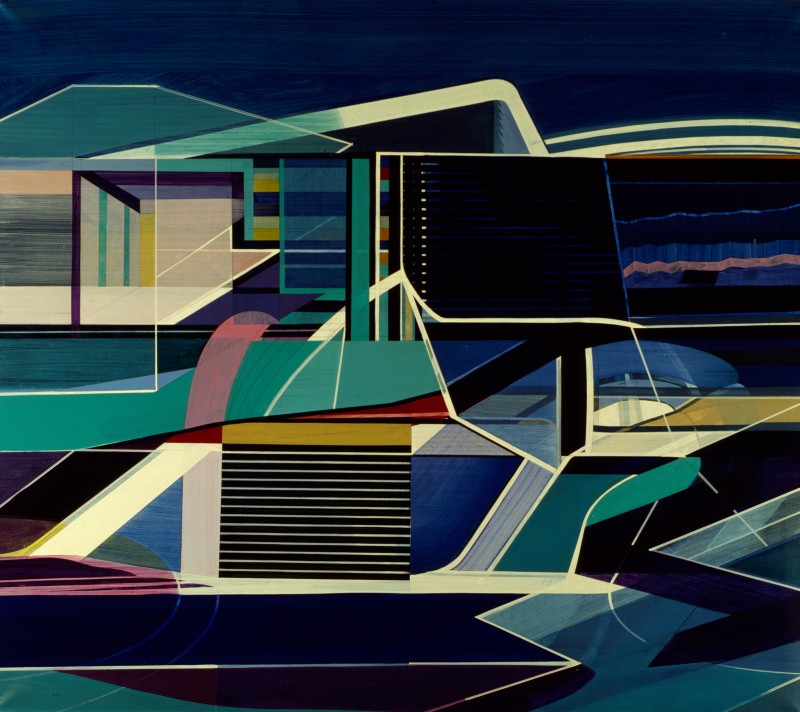
Garden Party, 1965, Cariplo Foundation

In 1961, in an exhibition with Gianluigi Mattia, he exhibited large-scale works at the Circolo degli Artisti. In the same year, Holden Caulfield—the protagonist of J. D. Salinger's The Catcher in the Rye—became his favorite and ideal character is a series of pastels, along with Alice in Wonderland by Lewis Carroll during 1962–63. In 1963, Bompiani Almanac (dedicated to American Pop Art), the exhibition held at the gallery Il Punto of Remo Pastori and Gianenzo Sperone, and above all, the friendship with Michelangelo Pistoletto, spurred him to make direct use of photographic images.

In particular, he used the pages of magazines like Look, Life, L'Espresso, and Paris Match, in which enquiries, documentaries, and ads all co-existed; anticipating television, which was still structured along theatrical lines. Thus he created his first photomontages.

In 1963 he graduated from Accademia Albertina and was immediately invited to various important exhibits, among which Alternative attuali; L'Aquila; the Tokyo Biennale; and the museum of Ixelles, Brussels. In 1964 his Alice in Wonderland sheets and his large scale acrylic-Pop painting are on a Solo Exhibition at the prestigious Galleria Galatea of Turin, under the curation of Luigi Carluccio. In the following years, Devalle took part in the first Mostra Mercato held in the halls of the Palazzo Strozzi in Florence, and in 1965 another Solo Exhibition at the Galleria Milano, Milan, where he exhibited a new series of acrylic and coloured pencil works. In those years Devalle also received various prizes, among which: the Città di Torino Giovani, the F.P. Michetti Prize (1963–64), the Città di Spoleto Prize (1963), and the San Fedele Prize (1966).

In 1965 he was a guest of the XXXIII Venice Biennale by Nello Ponente. In the same year he started to paint the Room-Landscapes (paesaggi-stanza), placing extensions of the paintings—parallelepipeds, tetrahedrons, and pyramids—next to canvases in order to modify the apparent placement of the painting, putting it in relation to the room containing it. In 1967, he took part in the touring Salone Internazionale dei Giovani organised by the PAC, and curated by Guido Ballo. He presented these large scale tridimensional acrylic painting in a series of important one-man exhibitions: at the Studio d'Arte Condotti in Rome; at the Galleria Blu in Milan; at the La Nuova Loggia in Bologna; and at Christian Stein, Turin. This period concluded with the exhibition of his last "room-works" at the XXXVI Venice Biennale in 1972.

=== Photomontages 1972–83 ===
In the late 1960s Devalle put aside large-scale works and acrylic colours and began to work with photomontages. He used pictures taken from fashion magazines, instead of from news magazines as in his works of 1963–1969. Through rigorous use of geometry, Devalle explored the faces and figures he appropriated from magazines, to produce new structural frameworks, the results of which Devalle called "real surprises".

Invited by Renato Barilli, Tommaso Trini and Maurizio Calvesi, he participated in Gennaio '70, the Biennale of young Bolognese artists; in Arte e Critica, in Modena, following a recommendation by Renato Barilli; in Environment, a documentary show organized by the Italian section of UNESCO in Paris ("Farfalla Night!", 1970, "Greta Garbo Galà", 1971).

After an empirical beginning, which lasted from 1963 to 1970, Devalle began to utilize geometry in a much more systematic way, for executional precision and truth in design obsessed him. Along with this work with photography there appeared tables that developed the creative process—real diaries of the sequence. Orthogonals, diagonals, and curves became autonomous subjects and in themselves created "effective surprises" ("Dal quadrato al cerchio", 1974, "Cinque quadrate in un quadrato", 1973).

In 1973 he held the chair of Theory of Perception at the Accademia Albertina in Turin. His works were shown by Daniela Palazzoli and Luigi Carluccio at the exhibition Combattimenti per una imagine at the Modern Art Gallery of Turin. This participation presented Devalle in an international framework, putting him in contact with other artists experimenting with the manipulation of photography such as Robert Heinechen and John Baldessari.

In 1975 the fashion images of the illustrated magazines were for the most part replaced by snapshots taken by himself or photographs of his family, of which photocopies were then made (that very same year, photocopying became a commercialised service in Italy). This latter work led him to use graphite and charcoal instead of the previous India ink-rotogravure combination. Carbon was not only the surrogate of the toner used in photocopying machines, but at the same time the "historical" material utilised in operations involving the transformation and integration of a photocopied image.

The photographic transfers used in the beginning as a quick solution for everyday duplications—temporary phases on glossy paper or on PVC—made Devalle realize that those "designs" were not only measurable shapes and transfers, but also "ready", autonomous, and definitive results.

In 1976 he was appointed chair of Theory of Perception at the Brera Academy in Milan where he relocated in 1979. He became regular Professor of Painting in 1980. Life drawing lessons. In 1979 Regione Piemonte dedicated to him his first anthological exhibition, edited by Paolo Fossati, Maria Cristina Gozzoli, Marco Rosci and Paride Chiapatti, at Palazzo Chiablese in Turin. In 1982 he was guest of the Venice Biennale and of the London Hayward Gallery with the exhibition "Italian Art 1960–1982".

=== Return to life drawing 1983–90 ===
"Le Corbusier (second version)" by Beppe Devalle, 1988

Suddenly, towards the end of 1983, Devalle dropped photography, which he had begun to find too restrictive a partner and reverted to drawing with a model, recovering pre-avant-garde historical movements working techniques, thus trying to find his personal position between traditional and modernity. He then began a new cycle of work: Ritratti (portraits) and Nature morte (still-lives) from life, executed in coloured pencils and pastel crayons. In 1983 he had a solo exhibition at the Galleria Lorenzelli.

From 1985 to 1987 he made the designs for the Cultura inserts of the Corriere della Sera, the Milanese daily. In 1986 he was guest of the XV Quadriennale di Roma with a Solo Exhibition. In 1987 he exhibited at the Feltrinelli Bookshop in Milan and, in 1988 at the Galleria Documenta of Turin and at the Galleria Nuova, Bologna.

=== Contemporary icons and large formats 1990–2000 ===
The early 1990s found Devalle enriched by his experiences in designing from life (1983–1989). He returned to using photographs and collages, as a new way of creating stories; a process which was also strongly influenced by the experience he had gained working for the Corriere della Sera. The photomontages were studies that would later give him new ideas for large-scale canvases.

In 1992 he transferred his studio to Pessano, an industrial site in Brianza. In the same year, Paolo Biscottini organized his second anthological exhibition at the Serrone di Villa Reale in Monza, with a catalogue tracing his artistic progress starting from the sixties (the catalogue is edited with Dario Trento, Maria Mimita Lamberti for Edizioni Charta, Milan).

During those years Devalle painted on big-scale canvases choosing his subjects amongst iconic figures taken from contemporary history, such as Ayatollah Khomeini and the writer Salman Rushdie (in the Solo Exhibition at the Galleria Lorenzelli, Milan 1992), and events from crime news, such as the murder of the tourist Barbara Meller in Miami (A Tourist Trap, edited by Marco Rosci, with text by Giulio Palmieri, Edizioni Charta, 1994; in his solo exhibition at the Circolo degli Artisti, Turin 1995, edited by Marco Rosci).

The solo exhibition of 1996, Nomi Blasfemi, edited by Maria Mimita Lamberti and presented at the Palazzo Massari in Ferrara and curated by Maria Mimita Lamberti, showed collages and paintings that represented some topical characters through holy texts and pictorial tradition.

In 1997 Devalle left the Chair of Painting at the Brera Academy and moved to New York, for the first of a long series of journeys to the United States. In 1998, "Monaci", edited by Dario Trento, was on exhibition the Murazzi del Po, Turin. A monographic volume on the collages of the 1970s was published in 1998 by Allemandi Editore and edited by Maria Mimita Lamberti: "DEVALLE: Photomontages 1968–1983".

In 1999 he moved from Queens to Manhattan. In the summer of the same year Devalle exhibited the fifty one-collages of the "STAMP-OUT" cycle, edited by Dario Trento, at the Salara of Bologna.

=== Last act 2000–2013 ===
In the summer of 2002, Devalle produced the volume US with Giulio Palmieri and Nicoletta Vallorani, dedicated to the paintings realized in the United States. In 2003 he returned to Italy. Fame (2004), curated by Giovanni Romano, followed the earlier "STAMP-OUT" and "US", featuring the artist's stories and obsessions.

In April 2006 the Modern Art Gallery (GAM) of Turin exhibited three large canvases ("Salvatore" 1995, "Nasdaq", 2000–01, "Pierrot and Arlequin", 2003) purchased by the De Fornaris Foundation. In the summer of 2007, Devalle exhibited, at the Museo Diocesano in Milan, Happy Times, one of the 14 paintings dedicated to the theme of suicide in the cycle For. In April 2008 the library of the Brera Academy hosted an anthological exhibition showcasing selected collages created between 1962 and 2007.

During the summer of 2008, the Museo Diocesano staged the exhibition You are my destiny, that presented a selection of large-scale canvases of the series For and Beauty and a number of portraits and studies of smaller dimensions. The catalogue of this exhibition (edition Silvana) collects essays by Carlo Bertelli, Paolo Biscottini, Flavio Fergonzi, Maria Mimita Lamberti, Giovanni Romano and Dario Trento.

In 2012, thirteen collages of the 1960s, selected by Flavio Fergonzi, were showcased in the exhibition Beppe Devalle, Collages of the Sixties by the Museo del Novecento Video Exhibit, Rai News.

On 4 February 2013, Beppe Devalle died in Milan after suffering a long illness.

On 15 May 2013, the Brera Academy commemorated the artist with a conference named L'arte è violenta come la vita ("Art is as violent as life") Interview RAI. During the time the Museo del Novecento of Milan remembered the artist with a temporary exhibition one of his most recent works, the large-scale painting Guardandovi.

== Selected exhibitions ==
- 1961: Turin, Circolo degli Artisti
- 1963: L'Aquila, "Alternative attuali"
- 1963: Biennale di Tokyo
- 1964: Brussels, Museum of Ixelles, "Phases"
- 1965: Milan, Galleria Milano
- 1965: L'Aquila, "Alternative attuali"
- 1966: XXXIII Biennale di Venezia, curated by Nello Ponente
- 1967: Milan, PAC, "Salone internazionale dei giovani", curate by Guido Ballo
- 1967: L'Aquila, "Alternative attuali"
- 1970: Bologna, Biennale dei giovani artisti, curated by Renato Barilli, Tommaso Trini and Maurizio Calvesi
- 1972: XXXVI Biennale di Venezia
- 1972: Quadriennale d'Arte di Roma
- 1979: Turin, Palazzo Chiablese
- 1982: XLI Biennale di Venezia
- 1982: London, Hayward Gallery, "Arte Italiana 1960-1982"
- 1986: XV Quadriennale di Roma
- 1992: Monza, Serrone di Villa Reale
- 1995: Turin, Circolo degli Artisti, Palazzo Graneri della Roccia, a cura di Marco Rosci.
- 1996: Ferrara, Palazzo dei Diamanti, curated by Maria Mimita Lamberti
- 2006: Turin, Galleria di Arte Moderna
- 2008: Milan, Museo Diocesano, "You are my destiny", curated by Paolo Biscottini
- 2008: Milan, Accademia di Brera
- 2012: Milan, Museo del Novecento, "Beppe Devalle: Collages of the Sixties", curated by Flavio Fergonzi

== Recent bibliography ==
- Catalogo online Artgate della Fondazione Cariplo, 2010, CC-BY-SA.
- "Devalle. You are my destiny. Dipinti 2001-2008", Silvana Editoriale 2008. Testi di: Carlo Bertelli, Paolo Biscottini, Flavio Fergonzi, Maria Mimita Lamberti, Gianni Romano, Dario Trento
- "Fame by Devalle", Segno e Progetto, Turin 2004. A cura di Gianni Romano
- "US by Devalle", Segno e Progetto, Turin 2002. A cura di Nicoletta Vallorani
- "Stamp Out by Devalle", Segno e Progetto, Turin 1999. A cura di Dario Trento
- "Devalle. Fotomontaggi 1968-1983", Umberto Allemandi Editore, Turin 1998. Testi di: Maria Mimita Lamberti, Dario Trento
- "Devalle. Nomi blasfemi", Edizioni Palazzo dei Diamanti, Ferrara 1996. A cura di Maria Mimita Lamberti
- "Devalle", Charta, Milano-Firenze 1992. Testi di: Paolo Biscottini, Maria Mimita Lamberti, Dario Trento
- "Santi Profeti Martiri" Edizioni Charta, Turin 1995. A cura di Marco Rosci
