= Lee Jeffries =

British photographer

- Occupation: photographer
- Known for: portrait photography of people experiencing homelessness, 72 Seasons artwork

Lee Jeffries is a British portrait photographer, living in the north of England, much of whose work is of people experiencing homelessness. In 2023, he had a solo exhibition at Diocesan Museum of Milan in Italy.

== Life and work ==
Jeffries has been making portraits of people experiencing homelessness since 2008. He made portraits of the band Metallica for the artwork of their album 72 Seasons (2023).

He is an accountant by profession.

== Publications ==
- Homeless: the Exhibition. Punto Marte, 2014. ISBN 978-8895157559.
- Lost Angels. Yellow Korner, 2014. ISBN 978-2919469215.
- Portraits. ISBN 978-1-5272-9218-5. With an introduction by Josh Brolin.
  - Second edition. ISBN 978-1-5272-9218-5.

== Solo exhibitions ==
- Diocesan Museum of Milan, Milan, Italy, January–April 2023

== Awards ==
- 2011: Photographer of the Year, Digital Camera magazine
