= Inamorata (Metallica song) =

Song by Metallica

from the album 72 Seasons
- Released: April 14, 2023
- Recorded: March 2021 – November 2022
- Studio: Metallica's HQ (San Rafael, California)
- Genre: Heavy metal
- Length: 11:10
- Label: Blackened
- Songwriters: James Hetfield; Lars Ulrich
- Producers: Greg Fidelman; James Hetfield; Lars Ulrich

Music video
- "Inamorata" on YouTube

"Inamorata" is a song by American thrash metal band Metallica, first released on their eleventh studio album 72 Seasons as the final track, and as of its release is the longest original song by the band, being 73 seconds longer than the previous record holder, "Suicide and Redemption" from the 2008 album Death Magnetic.

According to the band's vocalist/guitarist James Hetfield, the track is "a long classic song that screamed out to end the album. Really, really cool riffs in it, really great groove. I love the way it rounds this thing out".

== Background ==
The main riff of the track was first written while James Hetfield and Lars Ulrich were bored on a Zoom call. Elaborating on that statement, Hetfield went on to say that, "Lars and I sitting there, fiddling around, trying to connect over Zoom and write. The Pandora's box was opened at that point. We're bored, let's do some stuff. And that was one of the riffs that came out of that session."

The band has also stated that the track has heavy influence from heavy metal band Black Sabbath and more specifically, bassist Geezer Butler.

== Music video ==
The animated video for "Inamorata" was premiered on April 21, 2023 and was directed by Jess Cope.

It depicts a young man struggling to survive in the desert, and the hallucinations he experiences.

== Reception and composition ==
Loudwire's Chuck Armstrong stated of the track, "Inamorata stands out as a true epic that takes on a journey through a love/hate relationship with misery", overall enjoying the track. The Arts Desk's Tom Carr liked the track, describing it as a dramatic finale and behemoth that never tires or bores, seamlessly moving through different jams and riffs. Dave Everley of Louder Sound considers the track one of the best on the record, considering it a slow-burner that sees how far the band can push things. Writing for Kerrang!, Nick Ruskell described the track as a most interesting, proggy melody in a similar style to Baroness. He also thought the track felt like "Metallica celebrating being Metallica". Greg Kennelty of Metal Injection thought that the track was fantastic and one of the best songs the band has ever made, noting the "composed solos" by Kirk Hammett and Black Sabbath-style hi-hats and bass breakdowns.

== Personnel ==
Metallica

- James Hetfield – guitar, vocals, production
- Lars Ulrich – drums, production
- Kirk Hammett – guitar
- Robert Trujillo – bass

Production

- Greg Fidelman – production, mixing
- Jim Monti – engineering
- Sara Lyn Killion – engineering
- Jason Gossman – additional engineering, digital editing
- Kent Matcke – assistant engineering
- Dan Monti – digital editing
- Bob Ludwig – mastering

== Charts ==
Chart performance for "Inamorata"
Chart (2023)	Peak position
US Hot Hard Rock Songs (Billboard)	23
