= Screaming Suicide =

Single by Metallica

from the album 72 Seasons
- Released: January 19, 2023
- Studio: Metallica's HQ (San Rafael, California)
- Genre: Heavy metal; thrash metal; groove metal
- Length: 5:30
- Label: Blackened
- Songwriters: James Hetfield; Lars Ulrich; Robert Trujillo
- Producers: Greg Fidelman; James Hetfield; Lars Ulrich

Metallica singles chronology
| "Lux Æterna" (2022) | "Screaming Suicide" (2023) | "If Darkness Had a Son" (2023) |

Music video
- "Screaming Suicide" on YouTube

"Screaming Suicide" is a song by American heavy metal band Metallica, released as the second single in promotion of their eleventh studio album 72 Seasons. It was released on January 19, 2023, along with a music video directed by Tim Saccenti.

== Background ==
According to Hetfield, as the title suggests, the song is about the "taboo word of suicide" and to communicate the "darkness we feel inside of us", further adding how people cannot deny that they have had dark thoughts at one point in their lives. In the same statement he continues:

To face it is to speak the unspoken. If it's a human experience, we should be able to talk about it. You are not alone.

The track's lyrics have also been interpreted as telling the story of a person who is born "craving dopamine", only to be lured by their darkest fears and insecurities thinking themself as "living a mistake".

== Reception ==
Drew Review's overall enjoyed the song, noting how it is less fast-paced than "Lux Æterna" and that it felt more like a modern rock song than what you would typically expect from the band. Writing for Metal Planet Music, Paddy Gallagher also liked the track, noting how it sounds like the refreshed 2020s version of Kill 'Em All. They also believed that it felt like the band was moving towards a less complex, more basic sound.

== Personnel ==
Metallica

- James Hetfield – guitar, vocals, production
- Lars Ulrich – drums, production
- Kirk Hammett – guitar
- Robert Trujillo – bass

Production

- Greg Fidelman – production, mixing
- Jim Monti – engineering
- Sara Lyn Killion – engineering
- Jason Gossman – additional engineering, digital editing
- Kent Matcke – assistant engineering
- Dan Monti – digital editing
- Bob Ludwig – mastering
- David Turner – cover art
- Lee Jeffries – band portrait photography

== Charts ==
=== Weekly charts ===
Weekly chart performance for "Screaming Suicide"
| Chart (2023–24) | Peak position |
|---|---|
| Australia Digital Tracks (ARIA) | 25 |
| Canada Digital Songs (Billboard) | 33 |
| Canada Rock (Billboard) | 30 |
| Czech Republic Rock (IFPI) | 12 |
| Finland (Suomen virallinen lista) | 59 |
| Germany Airplay (TopHit) | 37 |
| Germany Rock Airplay (GfK) | 25 |
| New Zealand Hot Singles (RMNZ) | 20 |
| UK Singles Downloads (OCC) | 32 |
| UK Singles Sales (OCC) | 32 |
| UK Rock & Metal (OCC) | 19 |
| US Hot Rock & Alternative Songs (Billboard) | 32 |
| US Mainstream Rock (Billboard) | 1 |
| US Rock Airplay (Billboard) | 15 |

=== Year-end charts ===
Year-end chart performance for "Screaming Suicide"
| Chart (2024) | Position |
|---|---|
| US Mainstream Rock (Billboard) | 21 |
| US Rock Airplay (Billboard) | 49 |
