= Orion (instrumental) =

Instrumental by Metallica

from the album Master of Puppets
- Released: March 3, 1986
- Recorded: September – December 1985
- Studio: Sweet Silence, Copenhagen
- Genre: Progressive metal
- Length: 8:27
- Label: New Electric Way; Music for Nations; Elektra
- Composers: Cliff Burton; James Hetfield; Lars Ulrich
- Producers: Metallica; Flemming Rasmussen

"Orion" is an instrumental song by American heavy metal band Metallica from their third studio album, Master of Puppets, released on March 3, 1986, by Elektra Records. There, the song features as track seven. "Orion" was written primarily by bassist Cliff Burton. The song was named after the constellation of the same name, Orion, due to its "spacey sounding" bridge.

On September 27, 1986, while touring in 1986 to support Master of Puppets, the band's tour bus crashed, killing Burton. "Orion" was played over speakers during his funeral. After his death, Metallica frontman James Hetfield had the notes from the bridge of the song tattooed on his left arm.

== Background and writing ==
"Orion" is a multipart instrumental highlighting Burton's bass playing. A majority of the song was written by Burton, including the guitar solos. It opens with a fade-in bass section, heavily processed to resemble an orchestra. It continues with mid-tempo riffing, followed by a bass riff at half-tempo. The tempo accelerates during the latter part, and ends with music fading out. Burton arranged each part of the middle section, which features a moody bass line and multipart guitar harmonies. "Orion" contains two solos from Burton, one from Hetfield, and three from the group's lead guitarist, Kirk Hammett. Burton had originally intended to play all the solos on bass, but reluctantly gave up some to the band's two guitarists.

While demoing songs for Master of Puppets, "Orion" and "Welcome Home (Sanitarium)" had been one song, titled "Only Thing"; between the demo sessions and the album recording sessions, the two songs were split apart. However, this meant that the song had not been fully written before the band arrived to the studio in Copenhagen.

== Live ==
"Orion" is the least-performed song from the album. Its first full live performance was during the Escape from the Studio '06 tour, when the band performed the album in its entirety, honoring the 20th anniversary of its release. The song had previously only been played as a part of medleys, jams, or in an abridged form. On February 10, 2018, what would have been Cliff's 56th birthday, the group played the song. Lars Ulrich called the performance “a very special moment.” The band began playing "Orion" regularly on the M72 World Tour and the Life Burns Faster residency as a tribute to Burton.

== Reception and legacy ==
"Orion" has been widely praised by fans and critics alike. Cliff Burton's performance on the track has been widely lauded by critics and fans, and has been constantly regarded as the crowning achievement from his career as a bassist.

The song has been covered by numerous different bands and artists, including Tony Molina, Dream Theater and Mastodon. The song was featured in the film Metallica: Through the Never as well as the film's soundtrack. Unlike the other songs from the project, "Orion" wasn't recorded live, instead recorded at a soundcheck prior to the show where the other tracks were recorded.

The bass intro was sampled on the song “The Number Song” from Endtroducing..... by DJ Shadow.

After the death of Cliff Burton, the song became one of Lars Ulrich's favorite Metallica songs. "Obviously, the emotional component of 'Orion' with the Cliff element... and that whole middle piece obviously is… it's beautiful and so unique, unlike anything that obviously we had ever done before or pretty much done ever since".

=== Accolades ===
| Year | Publication | Country | Accolade | Rank |
|---|---|---|---|---|
| 2014 | Rolling Stone | United States | Readers’ Poll: The 10 Best Metallica Songs | 4 |
| 2019 | Metal Hammer | United States | The 50 best Metallica songs of all time | 6 |
| 2019 | Louder Sound | United States | The 10 Best Metallica Songs Featuring Cliff Burton | 2 |
| 2021 | Kerrang! | United Kingdom | The 20 greatest Metallica songs – ranked | 13 |
| 2023 | The A.V. Club | United States | Essential Metallica: Their 30 greatest songs, ranked | 3 |
| 2023 | Entertainment Weekly | United States | The 15 best Metallica songs | 8 |

== Personnel ==
Credits are adapted from the album's liner notes.

Metallica

- James Hetfield – rhythm guitar, 2nd guitar solo
- Lars Ulrich – drums, percussion
- Cliff Burton – bass
- Kirk Hammett – lead guitar

Production

- Metallica – production
- Flemming Rasmussen – production, engineering
- Andy Wroblewski – assistant engineer
- Michael Wagener – mixing
- Mark Wilzcak – assistant mixing engineer
- George Marino – mastering, remastering on 1995 re-release
- Howie Weinberg – 2017 remastering
- Gentry Studer – 2017 remastering
