= 72 Seasons =

2023 studio album by Metallica

Studio album by Metallica
- Released: April 14, 2023
- Recorded: March 2021 – November 2022
- Studio: Metallica's HQ (San Rafael, California)
- Genres: Heavy metal; thrash metal
- Length: 77:14
- Label: Blackened
- Producers: Greg Fidelman; James Hetfield; Lars Ulrich

Metallica chronology
| S&M2 (2020) | 72 Seasons (2023) | M72 World Tour: Mexico City (2025) |

Singles from 72 Seasons
- 1. "Lux Æterna" Released: November 28, 2022; 2. "Screaming Suicide" Released: January 19, 2023; 3. "If Darkness Had a Son" Released: March 1, 2023; 4. "72 Seasons" Released: March 30, 2023

72 Seasons is the eleventh studio album by American heavy metal band Metallica, released on April 14, 2023, by their own record label Blackened Recordings. 72 Seasons was produced by Greg Fidelman, who produced the band's previous studio album, Hardwired... to Self-Destruct (2016), and is the band's second studio album to be released through Blackened.

The album generally received positive reviews from critics, who mostly praised Hetfield's lyrics and vocal performance but criticized the album's length. In 2024, 72 Seasons received three nominations at the 66th Grammy Awards, winning Best Metal Performance for the title track "72 Seasons". It also won the 2024 iHeart Radio Music Award for Rock Album of the Year.

72 Seasons includes Metallica's longest original song to date, "Inamorata", which runs for 11 minutes and 10 seconds.

== Background and recording ==
In an interview with Australian magazine The Music's official podcast in March 2019, bassist Robert Trujillo said that Metallica had begun jamming on new material for its next studio album. "I'm excited about the next record because I believe it will also be a culmination of the two [previous] records and another journey. There's no shortage of original ideas, that's the beauty of being in this band." He estimated that the album would be released "a lot sooner than the previous two did... this time around I think we'll be able to jump on it a lot quicker and jump in the studio and start working. We've all vowed to get this one going sooner than later."

In an interview with Australian magazine Mixdown the following month, guitarist Kirk Hammett said that the band had tentative plans to enter the studio after the conclusion of its WorldWired Tour in support of Hardwired... to Self-Destruct. He stated, "We're in our third year since Hardwired. Maybe we can get a bit more focus and go into the studio a bit sooner." Having not contributed any writing to Hardwired... to Self-Destruct after accidentally losing his phone containing riff ideas at Copenhagen Airport in 2014, Hammett said regarding his ideas for the new album, "I have a ton of material. I've over-compensated, so I'm ready to go anytime."

In April 2020, amidst the COVID-19 pandemic, drummer Lars Ulrich said in an interview with Marc Benioff that Metallica could work on its next studio album while in quarantine. Trujillo told The Vinyl Guide in June that the band was "excited about cultivating new ideas" for its new album. "We communicate every week, which is really great, so we have our connection intact [...] what we've started doing is basically just really concentrating on our home studios and being creative from our homes and navigating through ideas and building on new ideas. And that's where we're at right now". He also said that the band was working towards eventually entering a studio to record the album. In November, Ulrich said in an interview with Phoebe Bridgers for Rolling Stone that the band was "three, four weeks into some pretty serious writing" and stated that "It's the heaviest thing, the coolest [...] but all kidding aside, if it wasn't because we thought that the best record was still ahead of us, then why keep doing it?" He followed up in January 2021 by saying that progress on the album had been "glacial", while vocalist/guitarist James Hetfield said in March that "It's either touring or writing, so COVID chose for us [...] but, yeah, [we will release] a bunch of songs. We wrote quite a few songs."

The proper recording sessions for 72 Seasons took place at Metallica's HQ in San Rafael, California, from March 2021 to November 2022. Greg Fidelman produced the album, while Sara Lyn Killion and Jim Monti engineered. The band followed COVID-19 protocols while recording, wearing masks and social distancing in the studio, although they performed together to achieve a live sound. The songs were also composed more collaboratively, with each band member contributing.

== Title and artwork ==
On November 28, 2022, Hetfield commented on the meaning of the album's title:

72 seasons. The first 18 years of our lives that form our true or false selves. The concept that we were told 'who we are' by our parents. A possible pigeonholing around what kind of personality we are. I think the most interesting part of this is the continued study of those core beliefs and how it affects our perception of the world today. Much of our adult experience is reenactment or reaction to these childhood experiences. Prisoners of childhood or breaking free of those bondages we carry.

The artwork designer, David Turner, explained that there was some initial pushback on the title because it was not as "hard-hitting" as the band's other album titles, such as Hardwired... to Self-Destruct, Death Magnetic, Ride the Lightning, or Kill 'Em All. Nevertheless, Ulrich liked 72 Seasons for that reason, for being "so out of left field". Co-designer Jamie McCathie described the title as "non-metal", which he argued was what made it "intriguing", saying: "I felt the excitement of this name, which doesn't sound like your average Metallica album."

The expression Lux Æterna, meaning "eternal light" and the title of one of the album's songs, inspired the artwork for 72 Seasons. Designed by Turner and McCathie, the artwork features a distinct yellow and black color scheme. Hetfield wanted the yellow to represent light and to directly contrast with the black of the burned objects, which included an infant crib, a switchblade, cigarettes, pill packets, and a destroyed guitar. Turner said these elements were included "with intention but left it open-ended enough that fans and members of the band could see it slightly differently". Hammett recalled that he felt "deeply, emotionally uncomfortable" when he saw the burnt crib, after which the other band members voiced their approvals. The objects were shot by photographer Stan Musilek and modeled by Mark Welsh in the former's San Francisco studio. The album's typography was designed by Ian Conklin, which Turner described as a "very chiseled, classic font that isn't trying to look metal".

== Release and promotion ==
On November 28, 2022, Metallica announced the album's title, release date, tracklist and a promotional tour of North America and Europe, featuring Pantera, Five Finger Death Punch, Ice Nine Kills, Greta Van Fleet, Architects, Volbeat, and Mammoth WVH, titled the M72 World Tour. The band subsequently released the album's first single, "Lux Æterna", along with a music video. On January 19, 2023, Metallica released a new music video for "Screaming Suicide". After teasing a new song on TikTok over the last few days of February, Metallica released a new music video for "If Darkness Had a Son" on March 1. The next single, title track "72 Seasons", was released on March 30.

On April 10, to further promote the album, the band appeared on Jimmy Kimmel Live!. They were interviewed by host Jimmy Kimmel and gave recorded live performances of 72 Seasons singles "Lux Æterna" and "If Darkness Had a Son", as well as the tracks "Master of Puppets" and "Holier Than Thou", which were each broadcast over the next few days. On April 12, Metallica sat for an extensive interview with Howard Stern on his SiriusXM satellite radio show. The band performed three songs during this appearance: Bob Seger's "Turn the Page", an acoustic rendition of their song "Blackened", and "Lux Æterna". On April 14, the day of the album's release, the band announced a partnership with the online game platform Roblox to feature the new album's songs in several of its games, along with virtual items being released onto the platform.

== Critical reception ==
Professional ratings
Aggregate scores
| Source | Rating |
|---|---|
| AnyDecentMusic? | 7.3/10 |
| Metacritic | 77/100 |
Review scores
| Source | Rating |
| AllMusic | 3.5/5 stars |
| The Arts Desk | 4/5 stars |
| Clash | 6/10 |
| Classic Rock | 4/5 stars |
| The Independent | 4/5 stars |
| Kerrang! | 4/5 stars |
| Metal Hammer | 3.5/5 stars |
| NME | 4/5 stars |
| Pitchfork | 6.4/10 |
| Rolling Stone | 4/5 stars |

72 Seasons received generally positive reviews, with critics singling out Hetfield's lyricism for praise, though the album's length was criticized. On Metacritic, which assigns a normalized rating out of 100 to reviews from mainstream critics, the album has an average score of 77 out of 100 based on 22 reviews, indicating "generally favorable reviews". At AnyDecentMusic?, that collates critical reviews from more than 50 media sources, the album scored 7.3 points out of 10, based on 18 reviews.

In the first review published for 72 Seasons, Classic Rock gave the album a score of 4 out of 5, describing the music as "titanium-plated modern metal" and describing the lyrics as "tormented and bleak". This review summarized 72 Seasons overall as an "intense album, one that goes hard for virtually every second of its 77-minute running time", and also stated that even though "ballads are absent and even big melodies are scarce", the album "won't disappoint anyone but the most truculent fan". In The Daily Telegraph, Neil McCormick rated this album 4 out of 5 stars. Similarly positive sentiments are shared in a Rolling Stone review, which says that the album shows Metallica "[playing] with more purpose than in their speed-demon days" and features segments that "don't sound like anything the thrashers have recorded before". The review gives the album 4 stars out of 5, remarking that Hetfield "[breaks] the facade of brash metal rage as he searches for his own truth" with an "agony [that] sounds authentic".

A more mixed review from Metal Hammer stated that 72 Seasons is an album where Metallica comes across as "simply [an] agreeably solid metal band", but it is still "worth taking a moment [for]" on account of James Hetfield's "genuinely moving" lyrics in which he "[digs] deeper into his early trauma [than] ever before". Although remarking that the music of the album "[nails] massive, crunching, half-time stadium metal", the review points out that much of it "maintains a similar tone and pace throughout" and often "can't match [the] dynamic range" that Hetfield's lyrics display. The review concludes by stating "the fact that Metallica have still found something new to say (if not play) deserves respect", and is "the best we realistically could have hoped for".

== Commercial performance ==
72 Seasons debuted at number two on the US Billboard 200, selling 146,000 copies in the first week with 134,000 coming from pure album sales; this marked the band's twelfth album to chart in the top 10 and the first since ...And Justice for All not to debut at number one on the US Billboard 200, thus ending the band's streak of number one albums at six. It was kept off the top spot by Morgan Wallen's One Thing at a Time, which was completing seven weeks atop the chart.

The album debuted at number one in 20 different countries including Australia, Austria, Belgium, Canada, Croatia, Denmark, Finland, France, Germany, Greece, Hungary, Ireland, Netherlands, New Zealand, Poland, Portugal, Scotland, Sweden, Switzerland and the United Kingdom.

As of May 2024, the album has collated a total of 373,000 album-equivalent units in the United States.

== Track listing ==
All tracks are written by James Hetfield and Lars Ulrich, except where noted.

72 Seasons track listing
| No. | Title | Writer(s) | Length |
|---|---|---|---|
| 1. | "72 Seasons" | Hetfield; Ulrich; Kirk Hammett | 7:39 |
| 2. | "Shadows Follow" | | 6:12 |
| 3. | "Screaming Suicide" | Hetfield; Ulrich; Robert Trujillo | 5:30 |
| 4. | "Sleepwalk My Life Away" | Hetfield; Ulrich; Trujillo | 6:56 |
| 5. | "You Must Burn!" | Hetfield; Ulrich; Trujillo | 7:03 |
| 6. | "Lux Æterna" | | 3:22 |
| 7. | "Crown of Barbed Wire" | Hetfield; Ulrich; Hammett | 5:49 |
| 8. | "Chasing Light" | Hetfield; Ulrich; Hammett | 6:45 |
| 9. | "If Darkness Had a Son" | Hetfield; Ulrich; Hammett | 6:36 |
| 10. | "Too Far Gone?" | | 4:34 |
| 11. | "Room of Mirrors" | | 5:34 |
| 12. | "Inamorata" | | 11:10 |
| Total length: | | | 77:14 |

== Personnel ==
Personnel taken from 72 Seasons CD booklet, except where noted.

Metallica

- James Hetfield – guitar, vocals, production
- Lars Ulrich – drums, production
- Kirk Hammett – guitar
- Robert Trujillo – bass, backing vocals on "You Must Burn!"

Production

- Greg Fidelman – production, mixing
- Jim Monti – engineering
- Sara Lyn Killion – engineering
- Jason Gossman – additional engineering, digital editing
- Kent Matcke – assistant engineering
- Dan Monti – digital editing
- Bob Ludwig – mastering

Artwork

- David Turner – design & art direction
- Jamie McCathie – design & art direction
- Ian Conklin – design & art direction
- Stan Musilek – cover & object photography
- Lee Jeffries – band portrait photography

== Charts ==
=== Weekly charts ===
Weekly chart performance for 72 Seasons
| Chart (2023) | Peak position |
|---|---|
| Australian Albums (ARIA) | 1 |
| Austrian Albums (Ö3 Austria) | 1 |
| Belgian Albums (Ultratop Flanders) | 1 |
| Belgian Albums (Ultratop Wallonia) | 1 |
| Canadian Albums (Billboard) | 1 |
| Croatian International Albums (HDU) | 1 |
| Czech Albums (ČNS IFPI) | 3 |
| Danish Albums (Hitlisten) | 1 |
| Danish Vinyl Albums (Hitlisten) | 1 |
| Dutch Albums (Album Top 100) | 1 |
| Finnish Albums (Suomen virallinen lista) | 1 |
| French Albums (SNEP) | 1 |
| French Physical Albums (SNEP) | 1 |
| German Albums (Offizielle Top 100) | 1 |
| Greek Albums (IFPI) | 1 |
| Hungarian Albums (MAHASZ) | 1 |
| Icelandic Albums (Tónlistinn) | 4 |
| Irish Albums (Official Charts) | 1 |
| Italian Albums (FIMI) | 3 |
| Japanese Albums (Oricon) | 4 |
| Japanese Rock Albums (Oricon) | 3 |
| Japanese Hot Albums (Billboard Japan) | 4 |
| Lithuanian Albums (AGATA) | 25 |
| New Zealand Albums (RMNZ) | 1 |
| Norwegian Albums (VG-lista) | 2 |
| Polish Albums (ZPAV) | 1 |
| Portuguese Albums (AFP) | 1 |
| Scottish Albums (Official Charts) | 1 |
| Slovak Albums (ČNS IFPI) | 5 |
| South Korean Albums (Circle) | 97 |
| Spanish Albums (Promusicae) | 2 |
| Swedish Albums (Sverigetopplistan) | 1 |
| Swedish Hard Rock Albums (Sverigetopplistan) | 1 |
| Swiss Albums (Schweizer Hitparade) | 1 |
| Swiss Albums (Romandie) | 1 |
| Taiwanese Albums (Five Music) | 3 |
| UK Albums (Official Charts) | 1 |
| UK Rock & Metal Albums (Official Charts) | 1 |
| US Billboard 200 | 2 |
| US Top Album Sales (Billboard) | 1 |
| US Top Rock Albums (Billboard) | 1 |
| US Top Hard Rock Albums (Billboard) | 1 |

=== Year-end charts ===
Year-end chart performance for 72 Seasons
| Chart (2023) | Position |
|---|---|
| Australian Albums (ARIA) | 99 |
| Austrian Albums (Ö3 Austria) | 14 |
| Belgian Albums (Ultratop Flanders) | 32 |
| Belgian Albums (Ultratop Wallonia) | 38 |
| Dutch Albums (Album Top 100) | 81 |
| French Albums (SNEP) | 60 |
| German Albums (Offizielle Top 100) | 3 |
| Hungarian Albums (MAHASZ) | 62 |
| Polish Albums (ZPAV) | 15 |
| Spanish Albums (PROMUSICAE) | 53 |
| Swiss Albums (Schweizer Hitparade) | 6 |
| UK CD Albums (OCC) | 10 |
| US Top Album Sales (Billboard) | 19 |
| US Top Current Album Sales (Billboard) | 15 |
| US Top Rock Albums (Billboard) | 23 |
| US Top Hard Rock Albums (Billboard) | 16 |

== Certifications ==
Certifications and sales for 72 Seasons
| Region | Certification | Certified units/sales |
|---|---|---|
| France (SNEP) | Gold | 50,000^{‡} |
| Germany (BVMI) | Gold | 100,000^{‡} |
| Poland (ZPAV) | Platinum | 20,000^{‡} |
| United Kingdom (BPI) | Silver | 60,000^{‡} |
^{‡} Sales+streaming figures based on certification alone.

== Release history ==
Release formats for 72 Seasons
| Region | Date | Format | Label | Ref. |
|---|---|---|---|---|
| Various | April 14, 2023 | Cassette; CD; digital download; streaming; double LP | Blackened | |
