= Lux Æterna (Metallica song) =

Single by Metallica

from the album 72 Seasons
- Released: November 28, 2022
- Recorded: March 2021 – November 2022
- Studio: Metallica's HQ (San Rafael, California)
- Genre: Thrash metal; heavy metal
- Length: 3:25
- Label: Blackened
- Songwriters: James Hetfield; Lars Ulrich
- Producers: Greg Fidelman; James Hetfield; Lars Ulrich

Metallica singles chronology
"All Within My Hands" (2020)	"Lux Æterna" (2022)	"Screaming Suicide" (2023)

Music video
- "Lux Æterna" on YouTube

"Lux Æterna" is a song by the American heavy metal band Metallica from their eleventh studio album, 72 Seasons (2023). It was surprise-released as the album's lead single on November 28, 2022. A thrash metal song described by James Hetfield as similar to the new wave of British heavy metal, the song is about the band's relationship with their fans, while the title means "eternal light" in Latin. A music video, directed by Tim Saccenti, was released on the same day as the single.

"Lux Æterna" was met with a positive reception from critics upon release. It charted in several regions, including reaching number 1 on the Billboard Mainstream Rock and number 13 on the Bubbling Under Hot 100 charts in the United States. It was nominated for the Best Rock Performance award at the 66th Annual Grammy Awards, while the music video was nominated Best Rock Video award at the 2023 MTV Video Music Awards. It is the band's most performed song live from 72 Seasons, being played for the first time at their "Helping Hands" benefit concert in Los Angeles in December 2022 and later being played during their M72 World Tour.

== Background and recording ==
Metallica worked on their eleventh studio album, 72 Seasons (2023), during the COVID-19 pandemic. With the band's members all working from home and their plans and typical schedule disrupted, production of the album was highly challenging for the band. Writing sessions typically took place over remote Zoom calls, joined by their producer Greg Fidelman. Bassist Robert Trujillo described the challenges of working on the album remotely at the time as fueling their creativity. One of the songs on the album, "Lux Æterna", was described by James Hetfield as a song that was "just fun", one that was easy and simple to write, and would be easy to play in live shows.

The recording sessions for 72 Seasons took place at Metallica's HQ in San Rafael, California, from March 2021 to November 2022. Fidelman produced the album, while Sara Lyn Killion and Jim Monti engineered. The band followed COVID-19 protocols while recording, wearing masks and standing far apart from one another in the studio, although they performed together to achieve a live sound. Trujillo played his bass guitar lines for "Lux Æterna" with a pick due to not being properly warmed up when it came time to record. This surprised Fidelman, who did not favor that way of playing. Lead guitarist Kirk Hammett improvised his guitar solo, which he went "pedal to the metal" for; he described the solo as an imitation of Judas Priest's K. K. Downing.

== Composition and lyrics ==
"Lux Æterna" is a thrash metal song, running for three minutes and 25 seconds long, with a tempo of 130 beats per minute. Hetfield described the song as being in the style of the new wave of British heavy metal. Throughout its runtime, the song features extensive drum pummeling from Ulrich and a guitar solo from Kirk Hammett, with Jon Hadusek of Consequence describing parts of the song as featuring a pop-punk sound. Joe DiVita of Loudwire likened the song to "Whiplash" and "Motorbreath" from the band's first album, Kill 'Em All (1983), as well as comparing it in style to songs by another heavy metal band, Diamond Head; "Lux Æterna" contains lyrical nods to "Motorbreath" with the line "full speed or nothing" and to Diamond Head with the line "lightning to the nations", the title of their 1980 debut album. Dave Everley of Metal Hammer compared it to the band's 1997 song "Fuel".

Lyrically, the song is about the relationship between Metallica and their fans and building a community, demonstrating this theme through lines such as "a sea of hearts beat as one unified" and "never alone for the feelings alike". The main chorus of the song is Hetfield yelling out "Lux Æterna"; the title means "eternal light" in Latin. Everley described the song's lyrics as an updated version of the "Metallica-vs-the-world anthem" "Metal Militia".

== Release ==
72 Seasons was announced on November 28, 2022, with "Lux Æterna" being surprise-released as the album's lead single on that day. When the song released, drummer Lars Ulrich monitored several social media posts and comments regarding the song, and kept track of their responses. Some members of the band, primarily Trujillo, were completely unaware that the song was releasing when it did, with Trujillo left confused when reactions towards the song came out.

"Lux Æterna" was first played live by the band on December 16, 2022, at their "Helping Hands" benefit concert in Los Angeles. It was later featured on the set lists for the band's M72 World Tour, in support of the album. As of March 2025, "Lux Æterna" is the band's most performed song from 72 Seasons in their live shows. The song has been featured in the rhythm games Beat Saber (2019) and Fortnite Festival (2023).

=== Music video ===
The music video for "Lux Æterna" was released on the same day as the single. Directed by Tim Saccenti, the video features footage of the band playing on a stage, with lasers flashing on screen in sync with the band playing. It was nominated for the Best Rock Video award at the 2023 MTV Video Music Awards, though lost to the video for "The Loneliest" by Måneskin.

== Critical reception ==
"Lux Æterna" was met with a positive reception from critics upon release. DiVita praised "Lux Æterna" as short, "quick-strike" thrash metal, believing that the song's short length and style was what Metallica fans wanted after several years without any new music. He further highlighted Ulrich's drum fills as "scream[ing] pure rock 'n' roll" and writing that it called back to "the era where the lines between rock and metal were blurred". Similar thoughts were echoed by Everley, who described the song as "fat-free" and the "punchiest and most muscular" that Metallica had sounded in several years. Comparing it in style to the band's previous albums Death Magnetic (2008) and Hardwired... to Self-Destruct (2016), he wrote that the song ditched the complexity of songwriting present on those albums in exchange for presentation. Hadusek viewed the song as compact, "no-bullshit melodic thrash metal". Ultimate Classic Rock described it as their heaviest release in recent times.

Both Everley and DiVita highlighted Hetfield's vocal performance, with the latter describing it as gritty and the former highlighting the lyrics. Hadusek described the song as having a simple rhyme scheme, and that while it was the "least inspired" part of the song, the vocal performances of Hetfield made up for it. Similarly, Andy Cush of Pitchfork said that it was the "worst offender for dopey rhymes" as a song that didn't move much beyond its opening line, though still praised the song, viewing the writing as not a significant aspect of the track's quality. Eli Enis of Revolver described the song as having a hook that "you can't help but holler along with".

In their list of the 30 best rock songs released in 2022, Ultimate Classic Rock listed "Lux Æterna" at ninth. On a readers poll for Revolver, the song was ranked as the third best song released that year. At the 66th Annual Grammy Awards, the song received a nomination for the Best Rock Performance award, though lost to "Not Strong Enough" by Boygenius.

== Commercial performance ==
In the United States, "Lux Æterna" appeared at number 13 on the Billboard Bubbling Under Hot 100 chart, which acts as an extension of the main Billboard 200. It also reached number 1 on the Mainstream Rock Airplay chart, number 2 on Rock Airplay, number 6 on Hot Trending Songs, number 8 on Digital Song Sales, and number 15 on Hot Rock & Alternative Songs. On the year end charts for Hot Rock & Alternative and Rock Airplay, "Lux Æterna" ranked at 7 and 97, respectively. In the United Kingdom, the song reached number 28 on the main UK singles chart, number 22 on UK Singles Downloads, and 10 on the UK Rock & Metal chart.

Elsewhere, "Lux Æterna" reached number 76 on the Canadian Hot 100 and number 3 on the Canada Rock chart, number 7 on the New Zealand Hot Singles chart, number 18 on the Digital Tracks chart in Australia, number 35 in Hungary, number 38 on the German airplay chart, and number 56 in Finland.

== Personnel ==
Personnel taken from 72 Seasons CD booklet.

Metallica

- James Hetfield – guitar, vocals, production
- Lars Ulrich – drums, production
- Kirk Hammett – guitar
- Robert Trujillo – bass

Production

- Greg Fidelman – production, mixing, recording
- Sara Lyn Killion – engineering
- Jim Monti – engineering
- Jason Gossman – additional engineering, digital editing
- Kent Matcke – assistant engineering
- Dan Monti – digital editing
- Bob Ludwig – mastering

== Charts ==
Weekly chart performance for "Lux Æterna"
Chart (2022–24)	Peak position
Australia Digital Tracks (ARIA)	18
Belarus Airplay (TopHit)	104
Canada (Canadian Hot 100)	76
Canada Rock (Billboard)	3
Finland (Suomen virallinen lista)	56
Germany Airplay (TopHit)	38
Italy Airplay (FIMI)	71
Hungary (Single Top 40)	35
New Zealand Hot Singles (RMNZ)	7
Poland Airplay (TopHit)	200
UK Singles Downloads (OCC)	22
UK Singles Sales (OCC)	28
UK Rock & Metal (OCC)	10
US Bubbling Under Hot 100 (Billboard)	13
US Mainstream Rock (Billboard)	1
US Digital Song Sales (Billboard)	8
US Hot Trending Songs (Billboard)	6
US Hot Rock & Alternative Songs (Billboard)	15
US Rock Airplay (Billboard)	2

Year-end chart performance for "Lux Æterna"
Chart (2023)	Position
US Mainstream Rock (Billboard)	6
US Hot Rock & Alternative Songs (Billboard)	97
US Rock Airplay (Billboard)	7
