= If Darkness Had a Son =

Single by Metallica

from the album 72 Seasons
- Released: March 1, 2023
- Studio: Metallica's HQ (San Rafael, California)
- Genre: Alternative metal; thrash metal
- Length: 6:36
- Label: Blackened
- Songwriters: James Hetfield; Lars Ulrich; Kirk Hammett
- Producers: Greg Fidelman; James Hetfield; Lars Ulrich

Metallica singles chronology
"Screaming Suicide" (2023)	"If Darkness Had a Son" (2023)	"72 Seasons" (2023)

"If Darkness Had a Son" is a song by American heavy metal band Metallica, released as the third single in promotion of their eleventh studio album 72 Seasons. It was released on March 1, 2023, along with a music video directed by Tim Saccenti.

== Background ==
The song was teased on February 28, 2023, on Metallica's TikTok as a duet with an instrument added each day.

== Reception ==
The song hit No. 1 on Billboard's Hot Trending Songs chart, and saw 1.1 million official U.S. streams and 1,000 downloads upon the release of the song. The song was also named the Heavy Metal song of the week by Consequence.

== Personnel ==
- James Hetfield – guitar, vocals
- Lars Ulrich – drums
- Kirk Hammett – guitar
- Robert Trujillo – bass

== Music video ==
The music video was directed by Tim Saccenti and filmed in Los Angeles on January 9, 2023, and was premiered on March 1, 2023.

== Charts ==
=== Weekly charts ===
Weekly chart performance for "If Darkness Had a Son"
Chart (2023)	Peak position
Canada Digital Songs (Billboard)	29
Germany Airplay (TopHit)	44
Italy Airplay (FIMI)	78
New Zealand Hot Singles (RMNZ)	34
UK Singles Sales (OCC)	53
UK Singles Downloads (OCC)	52
US Hot Rock & Alternative Songs (Billboard)	34

=== Year-end charts ===
Year-end chart performance for "If Darkness Had a Son"
Chart (2023)	Position
US Hot Hard Rock Songs (Billboard)	46
