= Diocesan Museum of Milan =

Art museum in Milan

Coordinates: 45°27′18″N 9°10′52″E

Museo Diocesano di Milano
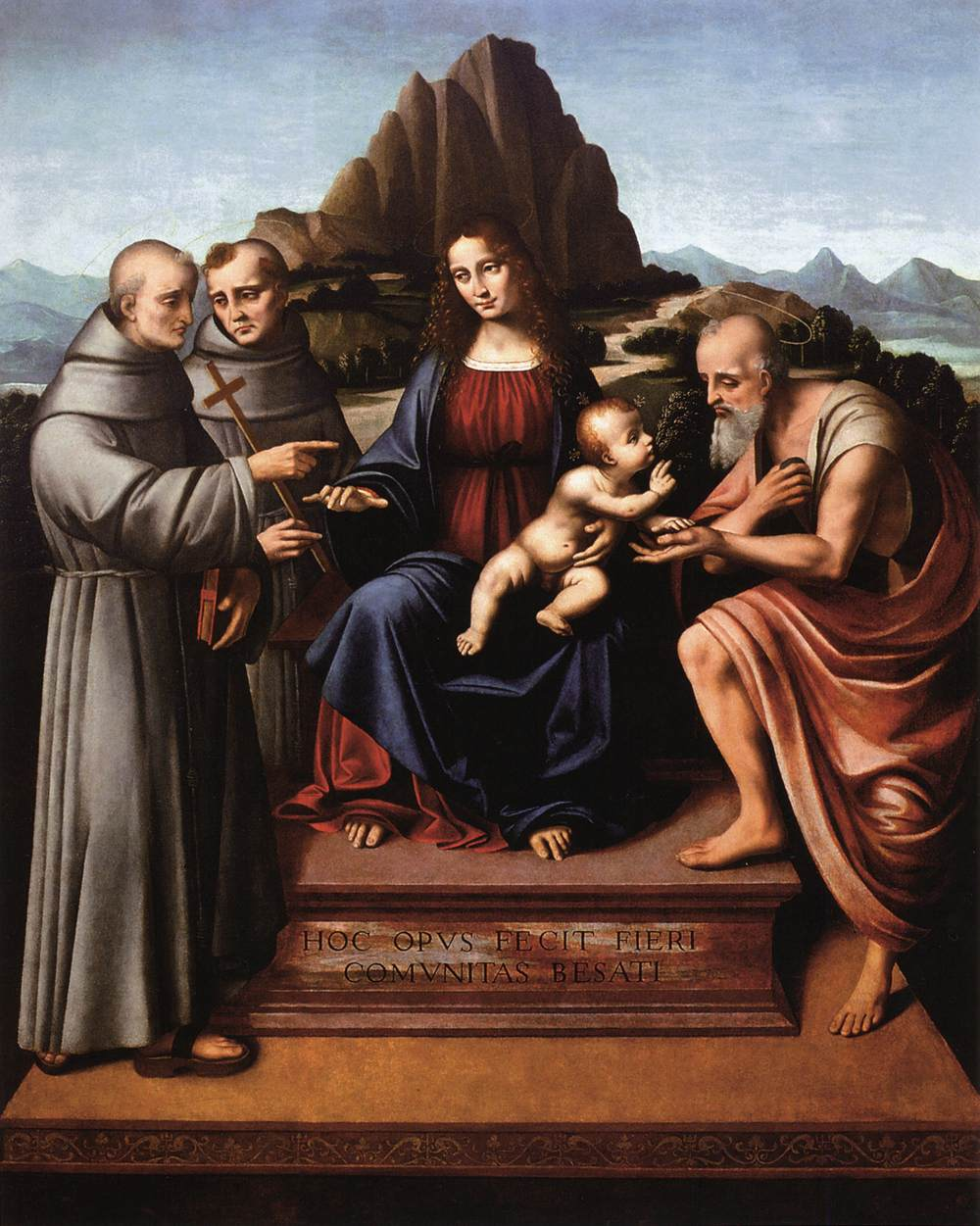
- Virgin and Child Enthroned with Saints, Marco d'Oggiono, 1524.
- Established: 2001
- Location: Corso di Porta Ticinese 95, 20123, Milan, Italy
- Director: Paolo Biscottini
- Website: www.museodiocesano.it

The Diocesan Museum of Milan (Museo Diocesano di Milano in Italian) is an art museum in Milan housing a permanent collection of sacred artworks, especially from Milan and Lombardy. Originally conceived by Ildefonso Schuster in 1931 as a vehicle to protect and promote the art collection of the Archdiocese of Milan, the museum was eventually established in the former headquarters of the Dominican Order in the back of the Basilica of Sant'Eustorgio with the support of Pope Paul VI. In 2001 Carlo Maria Martini inaugurated the current venue located in Porta Ticinese.

== Bibliography ==
- Milano e Provincia, Touring Club italiano, ed.2003, autori vari

== See also ==
- Diocesan museum
