= 72 Seasons (song) =

Single by Metallica

from the album 72 Seasons
- Released: March 30, 2023
- Studio: Metallica's HQ (San Rafael, California)
- Genre: Thrash metal
- Length: 7:39
- Label: Blackened
- Songwriters: James Hetfield; Lars Ulrich; Kirk Hammett
- Producers: Greg Fidelman; Hetfield; Ulrich

Metallica singles chronology
"If Darkness Had a Son" (2023)	"72 Seasons" (2023)	"Too Far Gone?" (2023)

Music video
- "72 Seasons" on YouTube

"72 Seasons" is a song by American heavy metal band Metallica, it was released as the fourth and final single from the band's eleventh studio album 72 Seasons alongside a music video. The song was first teased a couple of days prior on March 27, 2023, as a 15‑second excerpt, where they continued to release longer clips each day until its release. The music video features the band playing the song while being illuminated by lasers in front of artwork by Canadian artist Kelly Richardson. At the 66th Grammy Awards, "72 Seasons" won the award for Best Metal Performance.

== Background ==
According to James Hetfield, following the announcement of the album, the lyrics and song name mean:

"72 Seasons came out of a book I was reading about childhood, basically, and sorting out childhood as an adult. And 72 seasons is basically the first 18 years of your life. How do you evolve and grow and mature and develop your own ideas and identity of self after those first 72 seasons? Some things are more difficult than others — you know, some things you can't unsee and they're with you for the rest of your life, and other things you're able to rewind the tape and make a new tape in your life. So that's the real interesting part for me, is how you're able to address those situations as an adult and mature."

== Reception ==
Writing for Audio Ink Radio, Anne Erickson described the track as "actually feeling like you are going through a roller-coaster of seasons", describing Kirk Hammett's guitar as "sharp", and overall calling the song "a musical journey" alternating [between] fast-thrash guitar solos and musical breakdowns. Writing for Rolling Stone, Kory Grow also described it as being a journey of sorts, with "heavy-piston jugging riffs" and "a fiery, wah-wah inflected solo" by Hammett. Jon Hadusek of Consequence of Sound considered the song to be the "fastest" and "grooviest" of all of the singles released from the album. He thought the song to have a tensions-building instrumental with a quick tempo and a "soaring chorus hook".

== Personnel ==
Metallica

- James Hetfield – guitar, vocals, production
- Lars Ulrich – drums, production
- Kirk Hammett – guitar
- Robert Trujillo – bass

Production

- Greg Fidelman – production, mixing
- Jim Monti – engineering
- Sara Lyn Killion – engineering
- Jason Gossman – additional engineering, digital editing
- Kent Matcke – assistant engineering
- Dan Monti – digital editing
- Bob Ludwig – mastering

== Music video ==
The music video directed by Tim Saccenti and filmed in Los Angeles on February 12, 2023 and premiered on March 30, 2023.

== Charts ==
=== Weekly charts ===
Weekly chart performance for "72 Seasons"
Chart (2023)	Peak position
Australia Digital Tracks (ARIA)	29
Canada Rock (Billboard)	11
Germany Airplay (TopHit)	182
Germany Rock Airplay (Official German Charts)	25
Sweden Heatseeker (Sverigetopplistan)	16
UK Singles Sales (OCC)	51
UK Singles Downloads (OCC)	50
UK Rock & Metal (OCC)	11
US Mainstream Rock (Billboard)	1
US Hot Rock & Alternative Songs (Billboard)	16
US Rock & Alternative Airplay (Billboard)	4

=== Year-end charts ===
Year-end chart performance for "72 Seasons"
Chart (2023)	Position
US Mainstream Rock (Billboard)	8
US Rock Airplay (Billboard)	12
