= 2001 in heavy metal music =

This is a timeline documenting the events of heavy metal in the year 2001.

== Newly formed bands ==
- A Band Called Pain
- The Acacia Strain
- Acrassicauda
- The Agony Scene
- Ankla
- Årabrot
- ASG
- Audioslave
- Avatar
- Beardfish
- Behold... The Arctopus
- Black Cobra
- The Black Dahlia Murder
- Black Majesty
- Black Stone Cherry
- Blackguard
- Bullet
- Bury Your Dead
- Callisto
- Circle II Circle
- Cloudscape
- Cobalt
- Decrepit Birth
- Dragonlord
- Equilibrium
- Galneryus
- Ghoul
- Hacride
- Hinder
- Ion Dissonance
- Jet
- Khanate
- Kylesa
- Leprous
- Masterplan
- Memento
- Misery Index

My Chemical Romance

- Municipal Waste
- Myrath
- Pelican
- Persefone
- Power Quest
- Protest the Hero
- Pyramaze
- Rebellion
- Redemption
- Riverside
- Textures
- Seraphim
- Serenity
- Silvertide
- Sirenia
- Stolen Babies
- Suicidal Angels
- Volbeat
- WarCry
- Wisdom
- Year of Desolation
- Year of No Light

== Re-formed bands ==
- Celtic Frost
- Death Angel
- Jane's Addiction
- Rush

== Albums ==
- 40 Below Summer - Invitation to the Dance
- Aborted - Engineering the Dead
- Aerosmith - Just Push Play
- After Forever - Decipher
- Agora - Segundo Pasado
- Akercocke - The Goat of Mendes
- Alice Cooper - Dragontown
- Alice in Chains - Greatest Hits (compilation)
- Alien Ant Farm - Anthology
- American Head Charge - The War of Art
- Amon Amarth - The Crusher
- Amorphis - Am Universum
- Ancient Rites - Dim Carcosa
- Angra - Rebirth
- Anorexia Nervosa - New Obscurantis Order
- Anvil – Plenty of Power
- Arch Enemy - Wages of Sin
- Ark - Burn the Sun
- Arma Angelus - Where Sleeplessness Is Rest from Nightmares
- As I Lay Dying – Beneath the Encasing of Ashes
- Atreyu - Fractures in the Facade of Your Porcelain Beauty (EP)
- Avantasia - The Metal Opera
- Avenged Sevenfold - Sounding the Seventh Trumpet
- Bathory - Destroyer of Worlds
- Bathory - Katalog (Compilation)
- Biohazard – Uncivilization
- Black Label Society - Alcohol Fueled Brewtality (live)
- Bolt Thrower - Honour – Valour – Pride
- Bon Jovi - One Wild Night Live 1985–2001 (live)
- Breach - Kollapse
- Bruce Dickinson - The Best of Bruce Dickinson (compilation)
- Cathedral - Endtyme
- Chimaira - Pass Out of Existence
- Creed - Weathered
- Converge - Jane Doe
- Cradle of Filth - Bitter Suites to Succubi (EP)
- Darkane - Insanity (album)
- Dark Funeral - Diabolis Interium
- Destruction - The Antichrist
- Devin Townsend - Terria
- Dimmu Borgir - Puritanical Euphoric Misanthropia
- Divinity Destroyed - Nocturnal Dawn
- Dope - Life
- Drowning Pool - Sinner
- Edguy - Mandrake
- Emperor - Prometheus: The Discipline of Fire & Demise
- Ensiferum - Ensiferum
- Enslaved - Monumension
- Entombed – Morning Star
- Envy - All the Footprints You've Ever Left and the Fear Expecting Ahead
- Evergrey - In Search of Truth
- Every Time I Die - Last Night in Town
- Fantômas - The Director's Cut
- Fear Factory - Digimortal
- Finntroll - Jaktens Tid
- Flaw - Through the Eyes
- Freedom Call - Crystal Empire
- From Zero - One Nation Under
- Gamma Ray - No World Order
- God Forbid - Determination
- Godflesh - Hymns
- Godflesh - In All Languages (compilation)
- Gojira - Terra Incognita
- Graveworm – Scourge of Malice
- Grand Belial's Key – Judeobeast Assassination
- Gwar – Violence Has Arrived
- Iced Earth - Horror Show
- Ill Nino - Revolution Revolución
- In Extremo - Sünder ohne Zügel
- Integrity – Closure
- Jag Panzer – Mechanized Warfare
- Judas Priest - Demolition
- Kamelot - Karma
- Katatonia - Last Fair Deal Gone Down
- King's X - Manic Moonlight
- Kittie - Oracle
- Kreator - Violent Revolution
- Lacuna Coil - Unleashed Memories
- Lifer - Lifer
- Tony MacAlpine - Chromaticity
- Machine Head - Supercharger
- Marduk - La Grande Danse Macabre
- Mass Hysteria - De cercle en cercle
- Mastodon - Lifesblood (EP)
- Megadeth - The World Needs a Hero
- Moonsorrow - Voimasta ja kunniasta
- Moonspell - Darkness and Hope
- Mushroomhead - XX (compilation)
- My Dying Bride - The Dreadful Hours
- Nickelback - Silver Side Up
- Ningen Isu - Mishiranu Sekai
- No One - No One
- Occult – Rage to Revenge
- Oomph! - Ego
- Opeth - Blackwater Park
- Ozzy Osbourne - Down to Earth
- Pentagram - Sub-Basement
- Pig Destroyer - Prowler in the Yard
- Place of Skulls - Nailed
- P.O.D. - Satellite
- Powerman 5000 - Anyone for Doomsday?
- Primer 55 - (the) New Release
- Racer X - Superheroes
- Rage - Welcome to the Other Side
- Rammstein - Mutter
- Reveille - Bleed the Sky
- Reverend - A Gathering of Demons (EP)
- Rhapsody - Rain of a Thousand Flames
- Rollins Band - Nice
- Royal Hunt - The Mission (Royal Hunt album)
- Saliva - Every Six Seconds
- Savatage - Poets and Madmen
- Sepultura - Nation
- Sevendust - Animosity
- Silencer - Death – Pierce Me
- Skillet – Alien Youth
- Skrape - New Killer America
- Slayer - God Hates Us All
- Slipknot - Iowa
- Sodom – M-16
- SOiL - Scars
- Soilwork - A Predator's Portrait
- Solefald - Pills Against the Ageless Ills
- Sonata Arctica - Silence
- Static-X - Machine
- Stratovarius - Intermission (compilation)
- Staind - Break The Cycle
- Sum 41 - All Killer No Filler
- Summoning - Let Mortal Heroes Sing Your Fame
- System of a Down - Toxicity
- Theatre of Tragedy - Closure: Live (live)
- Therion - Secret of the Runes
- Throwdown - You Don't Have to Be Blood to Be Family
- Thursday - Full Collapse
- Tomahawk - Tomahawk
- Tool - Lateralus
- Tristania - World of Glass
- Unearth - The Stings of Conscience
- Virgin Black - Sombre Romantic
- Vision of Disorder – From Bliss to Devastation
- Warrant - Under the Influence
- Windir - 1184

== Disbandments ==
- 20 Dead Flower Children
- Emperor
- Death

== Events ==
- Metallica bassist Jason Newsted (who joined after Cliff Burton's death) officially left the band and joined Voivod.
- Former Body Count bassist Mooseman is killed in a drive-by shooting on February 21.
- Nightwish bassist Sami Vänskä is fired.
- Cradle of Filth sign with Epic Records, becoming the first ever black metal band on a major label.
- Kittie guitarist Fallon Bowman quits.
- Limp Bizkit guitarist Wes Borland leaves the band.

== Deaths ==
- December 13 – Charles Michael "Chuck" Schuldiner, founder, guitarist, vocalist, primary songwriter, and producer of Death and Control Denied, and former guitarist of Voodoocult, died from pneumonia and complications from pontine glioma at the age of 34.

Preceded by 2000	Heavy Metal Timeline; 2001	Succeeded by 2002
