= Just So You Know =

Just So You Know may refer to:

- Just So You Know (Jesse McCartney song)
- Just So You Know (American Head Charge song)
- Just So You Know, a song by Holly Palmer
