= Atheist's Cornea =

Studio album by Envy
- Released: May 13, 2015
- Genres: Post-hardcore, screamo, post-rock
- Length: 43:28
- Language: Japanese
- Labels: Temporary Residence Limited; Sonzai Records; Rock Action Records

Envy chronology
Recitation (2010)	Atheist's Cornea (2015)	The Fallen Crimson (2020)

Professional ratings
Review scores
Source	Rating
Drowned In Sound	(4/10)
Pitchfork	(6.0/10)
Punknews.org	4.5/5 stars
AllMusic	3.5/5 stars
Consequence of Sound	B+

Atheist's Cornea is the sixth album from Japanese post-hardcore band Envy. Atheist's Cornea is Envy's shortest full-length release since 1998's From Here to Eternity and continues along the artistic path set by their preceding record Recitation. It is the last Envy release to feature founding guitarist Masahiro Tobita and founding drummer Dairoku Seki.

== Track listing ==
No.	Title	Length
1.	"Blue Moonlight"	4:09
2.	"Ignorant Rain at the End of the World"	3:29
3.	"Shining Finger"	7:04
4.	"Ticking Time and String"	6:28
5.	"Footsteps in the Distance"	5:31
6.	"An Insignificant Poem"	4:42
7.	"Two Isolated Souls"	5:43
8.	"Your Heart and My Hand"	6:27
Total length:		43:28

== Personnel ==
- Dairoku Seki - drums
- Tetsuya Fukagawa - sequencer, vocals
- Nobukata Kawai - guitar
- Masahiro Tobita - guitar
- Manabu Nakagawa - bass guitar
