= No One (album) =

Studio album by No One
- Released: August 14, 2001; February 6, 2024 (digital)
- Recorded: Groovemaster Studios in Chicago, IL
- Genre: Nu metal, alternative metal
- Length: 44:29
- Label: Immortal
- Producer: Johnny K

Singles from No One
- 1. "Chemical" Released: 2001; 2. "Down on Me" Released: 2001

No One is the only studio album by Chicago nu metal band of the same name. It was released on August 14, 2001 via Immortal Records and produced by Johnny K who also worked with Chicago natives Disturbed and SOiL. Neither the band nor their debut release gained any widespread commercial attention, despite the album being classified under the once-popular nu and alternative metal genre. Two singles from No One were released in "Chemical" and "Down on Me" and received moderate radio play for a short time. The album was re-released by the band February 6, 2024 but the track listing appeared in a different order and alternate cover art.

== Background and recording ==
After forming the group, No One began writing and played their first show on August 5, 2000 at Champ’s. Having taken place between two Chicago dates for Ozzfest, the show gained the attention of Disturbed, Soulfly, and The Deadlights. No One only played two more weeks of concerts before joining Johnny K to record a 3-track demo. This resulted the recording of "Chemical," "It’s Real," and "My Release."

Shortly after, No One received a phone call notifying them that a Californian manager had been shopping the demo around without their consent. They were approached by Immortal Records and, after reviewing other offers, chose the aforementioned label due to their reputation for breaking in heavy metal bands, their promotional tactics, and their long-term approach in never having dropped any bands.

No One entered the studio in December 2000 without letting Immortal know that not enough songs had been written for an album. "Shedding", "Down on Me", and "Inside Out" were then written in the studio. After finishing up recording, No One resumed touring on April 5, 2001.

Vocalist Murk described the album in an interview: "It’s a journey of peaks and valleys. There is a lot of emotions and changes in it. I have been working on it my entire life. It definitely took a long time to write it and a lot of hard work."

== Touring and promotion ==
No One opened for Slaves on Dope and Hinge to promote their eponymous debut record. In July 2001, the band performed on the Second Stage of Ozzfest 2001 but canceled after only ten days. They also participated in the Pledge of Allegiance tour, a leg of Slipknot's Iowa World Tour co-headlined by System of a Down.

The song "Chemical" was released as the lead single. It gained moderate airplay in late summer and early fall of 2001 and had a music video which aired on MTV2. It was later included on the soundtrack to the video game Jonny Moseley Mad Trix. "Down on Me" followed as the second single. "Cut," "Chemical," "Hype," and "It's Real" were all featured in the game Hunter: The Reckoning: Wayward. A live rendition of "My Release" was featured on Pledge of Allegiance Tour: Live Concert Recording in March 2002.

== Critical reception ==
Professional ratings
Review scores
Source	Rating
Allmusic	2.5/5 stars

Allmusic's JT Griffith gave the album a 2.5/5 rating and emphasized No One's lack of originality and similarity to contemporaries but also their passionate, aggressive style: "No One is a good thrashing rock outfit, but original is not what they do. . . It may not be ground-breaking, but it is going to be hugely popular." He added, "The album cover has a picture of a man's face with his eyes covered like a prisoner. So when [frontman] Murk claims that he doesn't 'see a lot of (Korn or Pantera) in music today' it's easy to wonder if he is blinded too."

== Track listing ==
All music written by No One. Lyrics by Murk.

No.	Title	Length
1.	"Down on Me"	2:42
2.	"Chemical"	3:41
3.	"It's Real"	3:00
4.	"Shedding"	3:49
5.	"My Release"	3:18
6.	"Again"	3:33
7.	"Cut"	3:20
8.	"Nothing"	3:04
9.	"Inside Out"	1:36
10.	"Mindless"	4:10
11.	"Breathe"	3:38
12.	"Hype"	3:14
13.	"Falling"	5:19
Total length:		44:29

== Digital ==
The track listing was in different order

No.	Title	Length
1.	"Down on Me"	2:42
2.	"Chemical"	3:41
3.	"It's Real"	3:00
4.	"Nothing"	3:04
5.	"Cut"	3:20
6.	"Hype"	3:14
7.	"Falling"	5:19
8.	"My Release"	3:18
9.	"Inside Out"	1:36
10.	"Mindless"	4:10
11.	"Breathe"	3:38
12.	"Again"	3:33
13.	"Shedding"	3:49
Total length:		44:29

== Charts ==
Chart	Peak position	Year
Billboard Heatseekers	35	2001

== Personnel ==
=== No One ===
- Murk - vocals
- B-Larz - guitar
- Flare - bass
- Billy K - drums

=== Additional personnel ===
- Johnny K - production, engineering, mixing
- Tadpole - assistant engineering and music editing
- Ted Jensen - mastering
- Jason Markey - A&R
- P.R. Brown @ Bau-da Design Lab - art direction, photography, design
