= A Dead Sinking Story =

Studio album by Envy
- Released: 18 August 2003
- Recorded: Winter 2003 at Bazooka Japan Institute, Tokyo, Japan
- Genre: Hardcore punk, screamo, post-hardcore, post-rock
- Length: 1:02:58
- Language: Japanese
- Label: Level Plane; Rock Action; Temporary Residence (2008)

Envy chronology
All the Footprints You've Ever Left and the Fear Expecting Ahead (2001)	A Dead Sinking Story (2003)	Compiled Fragments 1997-2003 (2006)

2008 reissue

A Dead Sinking Story is an album by the Japanese band Envy. The album was released on August 18, 2003 on Level Plane Records. It is their only album recorded with three guitarists; Daichi Takasugi joined before the creation of the album and left after the related tour.

== Track listing ==
No.	Title	Length
1.	"Chain Wandering Deeply"	8:28
2.	"Distress of Ignorance"	5:54
3.	"Evidence"	3:16
4.	"Color of Fetters"	7:19
5.	"Unrepairable Gentleness"	8:10
6.	"Go Mad and Mark"	6:35
7.	"A Conviction that Speeds"	5:27
8.	"Reasons and Oblivion"	5:05
9.	"A Will Remains in the Ashes"	12:44
Total length:		1:02:58

== Personnel ==
- Dairoku Seki – Drums
- Tetsuya Fukagawa – Sequencer, Vocals
- Nobukata Kawai – Guitar
- Masahiro Tobita – Guitar
- Manabu Nakagawa – Bass Guitar
- Daichi Takasugi – Guitar
- Takashi Kitaguchi – Engineering
- Tatsuya Kase – Mastering

== Reception ==
Professional ratings
Review scores
Source	Rating
AllMusic	link
Stylus Magazine	A link
Punknews.org	link

Reception was almost uniformly positive, with AllMusic, Stylus Magazine, and Punknews.org all praising the album's hybrid of emo, screamo, and post-rock.
