= Insomniac Doze =

Studio album by Envy
- Released: 12 September 2006
- Recorded: Winter 2006
- Studio: Bazooka Studio, Higashi Nakano, Tokyo, Japan
- Genre: Screamo, post-rock
- Length: 57:53
- Language: Japanese
- Label: Temporary Residence Limited; Sonzai Records; Rock Action Records
- Producer: Envy and Takashi Kitaguchi

Envy chronology
| Compiled Fragments 1997-2003 (2003) | Insomniac Doze (2006) | Abyssal (2007) |

Professional ratings
Review scores
| Source | Rating |
|---|---|
| AllMusic | 3.5/5 stars |
| Almost Cool | 6.5/10 |
| Decoy Music | 5/5 stars |
| Drowned in Sound | 6/10 |
| Indieville.com | 8.8/10 |
| Lost at Sea | 9/10 |
| Mammoth Press | 9.5/10 |
| Pitchfork | 6.3/10 |
| Prefix Magazine | 8/10 |
| Punknews.org | 4.5/5 stars |
| Scene Point Blank | 9.3/10 |
| Stylus Magazine | B |

Insomniac Doze is the fourth album from Envy. The album was released in September 2006 by Temporary Residence Limited in the United States, by Rock Action Records in the United Kingdom, and by Sonzai Records in Japan. The sound of Insomniac Doze is characterized as being more epic and atmospheric than what is noted in Envy's previous albums. The album also displays Envy's ability to create a cohesive conglomeration of hardcore punk and screamo alongside melodic post-rock elements.

== Track listing ==
| No. | Title | Length |
|---|---|---|
| 1. | "Further Ahead of Warp" | 6:51 |
| 2. | "Shield of Selflessness" | 4:30 |
| 3. | "Scene" | 7:08 |
| 4. | "Crystallize" | 10:34 |
| 5. | "The Unknown Glow" | 15:28 |
| 6. | "Night in Winter" | 6:04 |
| 7. | "A Warm Room" | 7:18 |
| Total length: | | 57:53 |

== Personnel ==
- Dairoku Seki - drums
- Tetsuya Fukagawa - sequencer, vocals
- Nobukata Kawai - guitar
- Masahiro Tobita - guitar
- Manabu Nakagawa - bass guitar
- Takashi Kitaguchi - recording, mixing
