= Tango Umbrella =

Studio album by American Head Charge
- Released: March 25, 2016
- Recorded: December 2014
- Studio: Third Sky Studios, Kentucky
- Genre: Nu metal
- Label: Napalm Records
- Producer: Dave Fortman

American Head Charge chronology
Shoot (2013)	Tango Umbrella (2016)

American Head Charge studio album chronology
The Feeding (2005)	Tango Umbrella (2016)

Singles from Tango Umbrella
- 1. "Drowning Under Everything" Released: 2017

Tango Umbrella is the fourth and final studio album by the American alternative metal band American Head Charge, released on March 25, 2016 through Napalm Records. It is the band's final album to feature founding member/bassist Chad Hanks, who died in November 2017.

== Background ==
Following the band's 2011 reunion and release of the Shoot EP in 2013, an IndieGoGo campaign was started in 2014 as to fund the creation of the album; the target was exceeded by over 110%.

According to the band, "We touched upon different directions. Our influences come from the early '90s – Ministry, Tool, PJ Harvey and so forth. We cover a lot on Tango Umbrella. If people dig it – cool. If not: Go F Yourself!"

== Reception ==
Professional ratings
Review scores
Source	Rating
Blabbermouth	9/10
Cryptic Rock	5/5 stars
Distorted Sound	9/10
Metal Hammer	1.5/5 stars

Distorted Sound Magazine rated the album 9 out of 10, stating that the album "isn’t a window back in time, [...] but it is solid proof of the strength of AMERICAN HEAD CHARGE can continue with what they do and still produce solid belters through and through". A review from Cryptic Rock awarded the album 5 out of 5 stars.

A negative review came from Metal Hammer, who gave the record 1.5 stars out of 5: "After such a long wait, it’s a shame they haven’t made a great nu metal record or moved with the times."

== Track listing ==
Tango Umbrella
No.	Title	Length
1.	"Let All The World Believe"	4:24
2.	"Drowning Under Everything"	4:25
3.	"Perfectionist"	4:54
4.	"Sacred"	4:54
5.	"I Will Have My Day"	3:27
6.	"A King Among Men"	4:33
7.	"Suffer Elegantly"	4:34
8.	"Antidote"	4:06
9.	"Prolific Catastrophe"	4:39
10.	"Down And Depraved"	5:06
11.	"When The Time Is Never Right"	7:05

== Personnel ==
- Cameron Heacock – vocals
- Karma Chema – guitars
- Ted Hallows – guitars
- Chad Hanks – bass
- Chris Emery – drums
- Justin Fowler – keyboards, sampling

=== Credits ===
- Dave Fortman – production, mixing
- Aaron Zilch – "additional audio terrorism" on Antidote
- Kenny Schalk – drums on Down And Depraved
- Brian Bart – backing vocals
- Jeremy Parker – digital editing
- Sam Shearon – Art direction, design
- Richard Easterling – engineering
- Gentry Studer – mastering
