= Recitation (album) =

Studio album by Envy
- Released: September 22, 2010
- Genre: Screamo, post-rock
- Length: 64:33
- Language: Japanese
- Label: Temporary Residence Limited

Envy chronology
Thursday / Envy (2008)	Recitation (2010)	Atheist's Cornea (2015)

Professional ratings
Aggregate scores
Source	Rating
Metacritic	81/100
Review scores
Source	Rating
AllMusic	4/5 stars
Alternative Press	4/5 stars
musicOMH	3/5 stars
NME	8/10
PopMatters	2/10
Revolver	4/5 stars
Rock Sound	8/10
The Skinny	4/5 stars
Sputnikmusic	4/5

Recitation is the fifth album from Envy. Recitation continues to expand upon the band's previous albums by using further elements of post-rock and spoken word while also maintaining screamed vocals, and is often seen as an album of further growth for Envy that improves upon the predecessors by perfecting their mix of screamo, hardcore punk and post-rock. They also continue to use Japanese lyrics. It is the only Envy release to feature no clean singing, only screaming and spoken word.

== Track listing ==
No.	Title	Length
1.	"Guidance"	3:21
2.	"Last Hours of Eternity"	7:05
3.	"Rain Clouds Running in a Holy Night"	8:32
4.	"Pieces of the Moon I Weaved"	4:48
5.	"Light and Solitude"	7:58
6.	"Dreams Coming To An End"	4:04
7.	"Incomplete"	1:25
8.	"Worn Heels and the Hands We Hold"	5:44
9.	"A Hint and the Incapacity"	6:44
10.	"A Breath Clad in Happiness"	6:25
11.	"0 and 1"	7:32
12.	"Your Hand"	3:04
Total length:		64:33

== Personnel ==
- Dairoku Seki - Drums
- Tetsuya Fukagawa - Sequencer, Vocals
- Nobukata Kawai - Guitar
- Masahiro Tobita - Guitar
- Manabu Nakagawa - Bass Guitar
- Takashi Kitaguchi - Recording, Mixing
