= The Feeding (album) =

Studio album by American Head Charge
- Released: February 15, 2005
- Recorded: Early Summer 2004
- Studio: Westlake Audio (Hollywood, California)
- Genres: Nu metal, alternative metal, industrial metal
- Length: 45:34
- Label: DRT/Nitrus
- Producer: Greg Fidelman

American Head Charge chronology
The War of Art (2001)	The Feeding (2005)	Can't Stop the Machine (2007)

American Head Charge studio album chronology
The War of Art (2001)	The Feeding (2005)	Tango Umbrella (2016)

The Feeding is the third album by the metal band American Head Charge.

== Background ==
The Feeding was recorded after a two-year exile, and with the band experiencing internal tumult and personal demons. It is the only album with Bryan Ottoson on guitar. The song "Cowards", appears on the Ultimate Fighting Championship compilation album Ultimate Beatdowns Vol. 1. The song "Loyalty" was featured on the EA Sports video game NHL 06.

On May 1, 2026, The Feeding appeared on streaming services for the first time, as the album became available to be streamed on Spotify.

== Reception ==
Professional ratings
Review scores
Source	Rating
Classic Rock	4/5 stars
Kerrang!	4/5 stars
laut.de	3/5 stars
Metal.de	7/10
Ox-Fanzine	7/10
Rock Hard	7.5/10

The Feeding sold over 100,000 copies and received positive reviews.

== Track listing ==
The Feeding
No.	Title	Writer(s)	Length
1.	"Loyalty"	Justin Fouler, Cameron Heacock, Bryan Ottoson	3:27
2.	"Pledge Allegiance"	Chad Hanks, Heacock, Fouler	3:23
3.	"Dirty"	Chad Hanks, Heacock, Chris Emery, Fouler, Ottoson	3:27
4.	"Ridicule"	Hanks, Greg Fidelman, Heacock, Ottoson	4:48
5.	"Take What I've Taken"	Hanks, Fidelman, Fouler, Heacock, Ottoson	4:43
6.	"Leave Me Alone"	Hanks, Emery, Fidelman, Heacock, Ottoson	3:00
7.	"Walk Away"	Hanks, Heacock	3:38
8.	"Erratic"	Hanks, Heacock	3:22
9.	"Fiend"	Hanks, Emery, Fidelman, Fouler, Heacock, Ottoson	4:20
10.	"Cowards"	Hanks, Fouler, Heacock, Ottoson	2:51
11.	"To Be Me"	Hanks, Fouler, Heacock, Ottoson	4:43

Bonus track
No.	Title	Writer(s)	Length
12.	"Downstream" (UK bonus track)	Hanks, Heacock, Ottoson	3:52

== Music videography ==
Video Still	Release date	Song	Director	Label	Additional information
		Loyalty	Mike Sloat	DRT Entertainment/Nitrus Records	First official music video release taken from "The Feeding".

== Personnel ==
- Cameron Heacock - vocals
- Chad Hanks - bass
- Justin Fouler - keyboards, samples
- Bryan Ottoson - guitar
- Chris Emery - drums
- Karma Singh Cheema - guitar

=== Credits ===
- Greg Fidelman - producer, engineer, additional guitar
- Dan Monti - editing, engineer
- Cesar Ramirez - assistant engineer
- Louie Teran - mastering
- Mauro Rubbi - drum tech
- Christine Fiene - project coordinator
- Gary Richards - manager
- Dustin Fildes - cover art
- James Killingsworth - meditation & inspiration
