= The Fallen Crimson =

Studio album by Envy
- Released: 7 February 2020
- Recorded: Summer 2019
- Studios: Ultra Vibe, Powerhouse Studios (East Hanover); Bonati Mastering (New York City)
- Genres: Post-hardcore; post-rock; screamo
- Length: 54:27
- Labels: Temporary Residence; Pelagic; Sonzai

Envy chronology
Atheist's Cornea (2015)	The Fallen Crimson (2020)	Eunoia (2024)

Singles from The Fallen Crimson
- 1. "A Step in the Morning Glow" Released: 14 November 2019; 2. "A Faint New World" Released: 17 January 2020

The Fallen Crimson is the seventh studio album by the Japanese screamo band Envy. It was released on 7 February 2020 through Sonzai Records in Asia, Pelagic Records in Europe and South Africa, and Temporary Residence Limited in North America. Several members of Envy, including frontman Tetsuya Fukagawa, departed the band following the release of their previous album, Atheist's Cornea (2015). Though they managed to recruit some new members, they found replacing Fukagawa to be a difficult task, and nearly disbanded as a result. Unexpectedly, Fukagawa joined them on stage during a 2018 concert; he later officially rejoined the band.

Musically, The Fallen Crimson is primarily a post-hardcore, post-rock, and screamo album. It also incorporates elements of other genres, such as hardcore punk, indie rock, and metal. Two singles, "A Step in the Morning Glow" and "A Faint New World", preceded the album's release. It received positive reviews from music critics, who complimented the band's fusion of disparate genres, as well as Fukagawa's diverse vocal performance. Several critics opined that the band were revitalized by Fukagawa's return. Writers for Kerrang!, Metal Injection, and Maximum Rocknroll placed the album on lists of the best albums of 2020.

== Background and recording ==
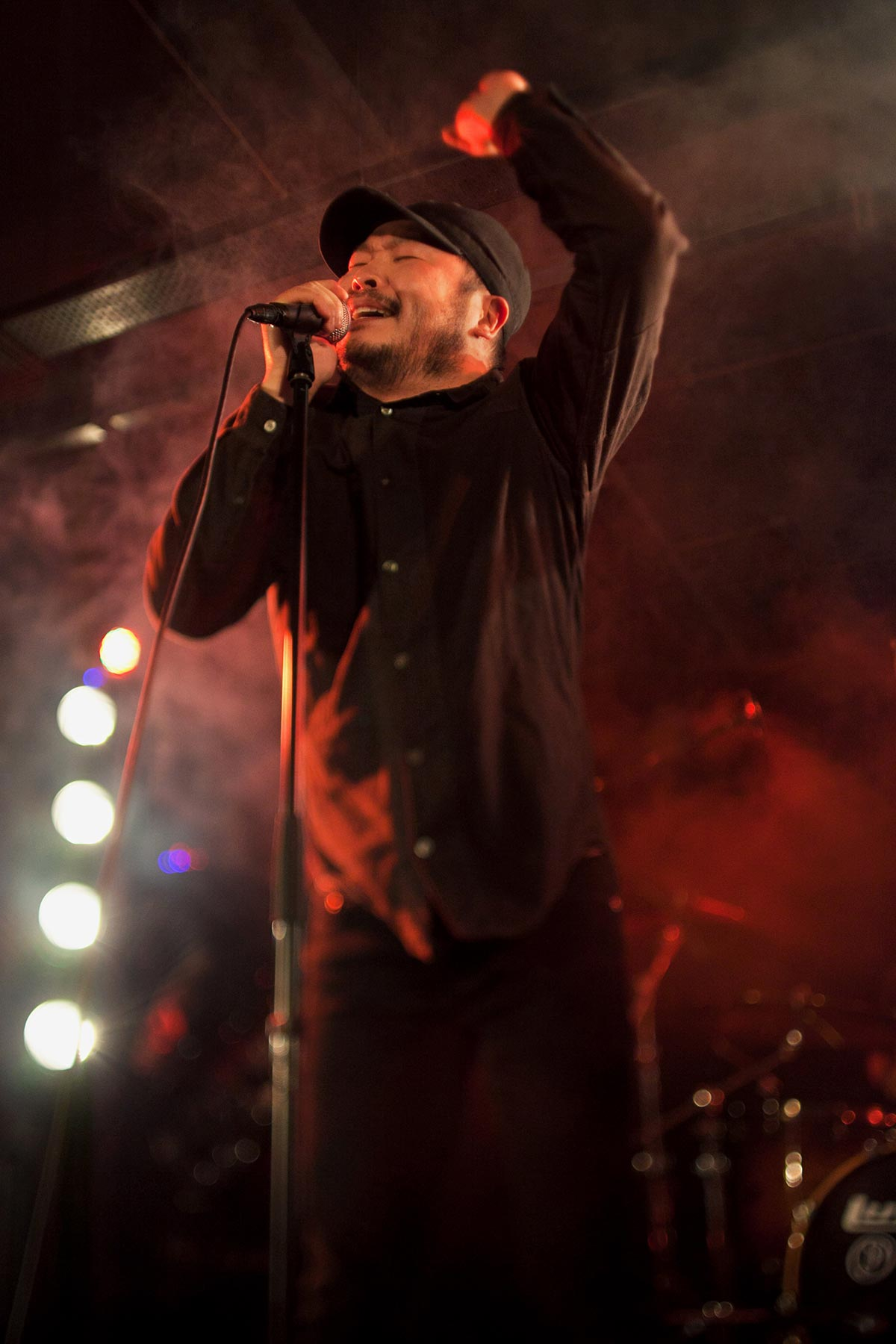
Frontman Tetsuya Fukagawa performing with Envy in 2011

Envy released their sixth studio album, Atheist's Cornea, in 2015. On 1 April the following year, vocalist Tetsuya Fukagawa, who had been with the band since their inception, announced his departure from the band for unspecified reasons. Their guitarist Masahiro Tobita departed the band shortly thereafter, as did drummer Dairoku Seki. The remaining members – guitarist Nobukata Kawai and bassist Manabu Nakagawa – chose to continue as Envy. They recruited three new members: guitarists Yoshimitsu Taki and yOshi; and drummer Hiroki Watanabe. However, they nearly disbanded as they cycled through numerous vocalists.

During a show on 1 April 2018 – the two-year anniversary of Fukagawa's departure, and the first day of the Japanese fiscal year – Fukagawa unexpectedly joined the band on stage. The band followed this by releasing an extended play (EP), Alnair in August, on 2 November, with Fukagawa having officially rejoined the band. The EP contained two songs: "Marginalized Thread" and "Dawn and Gaze".

Envy began working on their seventh studio album in early 2019. According to Kawai, the band wrote songs in as little as "two or three hours". The band and their crew traveled to the northeastern United States to complete the album. During the summer, Daisuke Yamashita engineered and mixed the album at Ultra Vibe in Powerhouse Studio in East Hanover, New Jersey. Josh Bonati mastered the album at Bonati Mastering in New York City.

== Release ==
On 1 November 2019, Envy announced that they would release a new album, The Fallen Crimson, on 7 February 2020. Sonzai Records distributed the album in Asia; Pelagic Records in Europe and South Africa; and Temporary Residence Limited in North America. Concurrently with the announcement, the band unveiled the album's tracklist, which contained both "Marginalized Thread" and "Dawn and Gaze" as the fifth and ninth tracks out of 11. They also released a trailer for the album, which itself featured a teaser for its third track, "A Faint New World". The band released the album's closer, "A Step in the Morning Glow", as its lead single on 14 November 2019. "A Faint New World" followed as the album's second single on 17 January 2020; the band released an accompanying music video six days later.

== Composition ==
The Fallen Crimson is primarily a post-hardcore, post-rock, and screamo album. (Note: Attributed to multiple sources:) In a review for Distorted Sound Magazine, writer Daniel Fella described the album's sound as "grab[bing] post-rock in one hand and hardcore [punk] in the other before slamming them together like a supernova". Critics singled out the album's first song, "Statement of Freedom", as an example of the influence from hardcore punk, with Invisible Oranges writer Alex Brown saying the same of eighth track "Fingerprint Mark". Fella and Stereogum's Tom Breihan detected influence from metal. Punknews described second track "Swaying Leaves and Scattering Breath" as indie rock, comparing it to the bands Cloud Nothings and Japandroids; Fella likened it to the band Alexisonfire. Fourth track "Rhythm" begins with a neofolk passage.

The album often contrasts elements with each other for dramatic effect, particuarly to build and release tension. Songs frequently eschew typical verse–chorus structures. For example, "Statement of Freedom" begins with a heavy and dissonant screamed section, which is followed by a spoken word passage. Near the end of the song, Fukagawa screams over an otherwise quiet backing. Fukagawa employs several vocal techniques across the album, including black metal-esque screaming, clean singing, spoken word, and growling. (Note: Attributed to multiple sources:) His vocals are absent from one song: "Rhythm" features guest singer Achiko of the Japanese duo Ropes as its only vocalist. The song is Envy's first on which a woman helms lead vocals.

== Reception ==
Professional ratings
Review scores
Source	Rating
Distorted Sound Magazine	8/10
Kerrang!	4/5
Ox-Fanzine	4/5 stars
Punknews	4/5 stars
Rock Zone	4/5 stars

The Fallen Crimson received positive reviews from music critics. Several remarked that the album's emotional impact transcended the language barrier. Stereogum selected it as their "Album of the Week": Breihan praised it for its simultaneously pristine and intense qualities; its command of tension and release; and Fukagawa's diverse vocals. He further considered the album to be an immersive listening experience and accessible to anyone who had not yet listened to Envy. Additionally, he commented that it could lend poignance and catharsis to "the dumbest show on TV". In a review for Kerrang!, writer Olly Thomas hailed the album as "a potent reminder that Envy were successfully blending cataclysmic heaviness and seductive beauty long before anyone had coined the term blackgaze." They further opined that even the album's heaviest moments were uplifting, citing "Marginalized Thread" as an example.

Punknews called The Fallen Crimson one of the band's most accessible and best albums. The reviewer highlighted the tracks "Marginalized Thread" and "Hikari" as filmic and unpredictable; they also complimented "Rhythm" as a highly successful experiment in including a woman's vocals. Rock Zone was less enthused with "Rhythm" and called it the album's weakest track, but was positive towards the album overall: Reviewer Jordi Meya commended the band as reliable and liked the juxtaposition of chaotic passages with calmer ones. Brown praised the album for its "cinematic" qualities and emotional resonance. He lauded Achiko's guest vocals on "Rhythm" and the harsh vocals of Fukagawa throughout the album. However, he also criticized the spoken word passages as monotonous, lamenting that they diluted the album's intensity.

Fella praised The Fallen Crimson for fusing hardcore punk and post-rock in an unorthodox yet effective manner, and felt that Fukagawa's return revitalized the band. He found the album to be eclectic yet coherent, while also the band's catchiest album to date. In a four-star review, Ox-Fanzine declared the album to be evidence that Envy had remained reliable even through the shifts in its lineup; the publication opined that the album capitalized on the band's variety and ability to contrast heavy and soft passages. Metal Storm's Count Radula found the album to be slightly overlong, and wished that Envy had done more to differentiate songs from each other, but was otherwise positive: Radula commended the band for their "master[y]" in blending disparate elements.

Reviewers frequently highlighted "Statement of Freedom". Breihan and Fella praised the song as a forceful opener to The Fallen Crimson, while also lauding the song for incorporating melody and spoken word as it progressed. Punknews wrote that it embodied the "political edges" of the album, and complimented its personal lyricism. Thomas considered it to be a relatively straightforward song on an album which blended several contradictory elements.

=== Year-end lists ===
Kerrang! ranked The Fallen Crimson at number 30 on its list of the best albums of 2020; writer Sam Coare praised the album for its vitality in defiance of the band nearly breaking up, and for the diversity of the vocal performances. Two writers for Metal Injection, Frank Godla and Riley Rowe, each placed the album on separate year-end lists: Godla on an unranked top 15, and Rowe at number seven. Ryan Hertel for Maximum Rocknroll included the album on an unranked list of the 10 best albums of 2020.

== Track listing ==
No.	Title	Length
1.	"Statement of Freedom"	3:49
2.	"Swaying Leaves and Scattering Breath"	4:13
3.	"A Faint New World"	5:28
4.	"Rhythm"	6:21
5.	"Marginalized Thread"	3:34
6.	"Hikari"	5:36
7.	"Eternal Memories and Reincarnation"	3:09
8.	"Fingerprint Mark"	3:05
9.	"Dawn and Gaze"	6:44
10.	"Memories and the Limit"	5:09
11.	"A Step in the Morning Glow"	7:14
Total length:		54:27

== Personnel ==
Credits are adapted from the liner notes of The Fallen Crimson.

- Envy – performance
  - Tetsuya Fukagawa
  - Nobukata Kawai
  - Manabu Nakagawa
  - Yoshimitsu Taki
  - Hiroki Watanabe
  - yOshi
- Achiko – vocals (4)
- Josh Bonati – mastering
- David V. D'Andrea – artwork
- Hayato Minesaki – English translations
- Taku Nakai – design
- TOWA – insert painting
- Osami Yabuta – photography
- Daisuke Yamashita – engineering, mixing
- yOshi – English translations
