= The War of Art (American Head Charge album) =

Studio album by American Head Charge
- Released: August 28, 2001
- Recorded: December 2000 – February 2001
- Studio: The Mansion (Laurel Canyon)
- Genres: Nu metal; industrial metal
- Length: 67:47
- Label: American
- Producers: Rick Rubin; Chad Hanks; Cameron Heacock

American Head Charge chronology
Trepanation (1999)	The War of Art (2001)	The Feeding (2005)

Singles from The War of Art
- 1. "Just So You Know" Released: May 27, 2002

The War of Art is the second studio album by industrial metal band American Head Charge, released on August 28, 2001 through American Recordings. It was produced by Rick Rubin. Several songs on the album were re-recorded from the band's self-released debut album Trepanation (1999).

The War of Art received positive reviews from critics and debuted at number 118 on the Billboard 200 and number one on the Top Heatseekers chart. The album also charted at number 90 on the UK Albums Chart. By 2015, the album had sold 250,000 copies worldwide. In 2022, Metal Hammer ranked the album as the 20th greatest nu metal album of all time.

== Album information ==
The album was recorded between December 2000 and February 2001 at Rick Rubin's allegedly haunted recording studio. The title is a play on words of the Chinese book The Art of War by Sun Tzu. This is the band's only album with Aaron Zilch on samplers, and David Rogers and Wayne Kile together on guitar. After the departure of Zilch, Fowler remained the band's sole keyboardist/sampler.

The album landed American Head Charge a spot at Ozzfest 2001. Their concerts featured some controversy due to the band firing shotguns and burning American flags on stage. A live version of the song "Reach and Touch" appears on the album Ozzfest 2001: The Second Millennium. A live version of "Seamless" appears on the album Pledge of Allegiance Tour: Live Concert Recording. Music videos were released for "Just So You Know" and "All Wrapped Up".

== Commercial performance ==
The War of Art debuted at number 118 on the Billboard 200 chart, with first-week sales of 12,000 copies, with 4,000 copies of those copies being sold in the album's first day of release. The album's sales surpassed the expectations of the band and American Recordings, who believed it would only manage to sell 7,000 copies in its first week. By 2015, The War of Art had sold over 250,000 copies worldwide.

== Reception ==
Professional ratings
Review scores
Source	Rating
AllMusic	4/5 stars
Anti Music	4.5/5 stars
Kerrang!	4/5 stars
Metal Storm	8.0/10
Metal Hammer	7/10
Rough Edge	4/5
Rolling Stone	(positive)
Ultimate Guitar	9.5/10
Q	1/5 stars
Request Magazine	74/100

The War of Art received positive reviews from critics. AllMusic called the album "brutal, loud, and insanely intense" and that "the band is one of the most intelligent, interesting, and compelling metal bands to surface." CMJ said, "aiming its cannons, grenades and shotguns at point-blank range... its spliced with programming and aggro geetars." NME called it an "outstanding slab of modern heavy metal."

Katherine Turman said that "sirens, industrial noise, and ultra-intense vocals kick off The War of Art's aptly titled opening cut 'A Violent Reaction'", and that the band have "deftly produced, well-conceived, and fully realized songs and approach." Metal Observer called it "an album that forms a unity for itself and wins in power and intensity with each repeated listen." AntiMusic said that "from start to finish The War of Art is an uncompromising heavy album filled with righteous screams, in your face bass and drums and searing guitars." Rough Edge said that the album "is one hour plus of blistering, mind blowing, molten metal" and that "song after song after song is nothing less than a pure metal experience." Star Tribune music critic Chris Riemenschneider named the album No. 10 in his top 10 Minnesota records of 2001, saying, "From start to finish, this major-label debut doesn't let up on its Ministry-inspired rhythmic pounding and crunchy guitar wattage.". Matt Peiken of the St. Paul Pioneer Press called the album "one of the unheralded surprises of 2001."

=== Accolades ===
Publication	Country	Accolade	Year	Rank
Metal Hammer	United Kingdom	The 50 Best Nu Metal Albums of All Time	2022	20
The Nu Metal Agenda	United States	The 100 Greatest Nu Metal Albums of All Time	2024	3

== Track listing ==
All tracks are written by Chad Hanks and Cameron Heacock, except where noted.

No.	Title	Music	Length
1.	"A Violent Reaction"		4:12
2.	"Pushing the Envelope"		3:13
3.	"Song for the Suspect"		4:11
4.	"Never Get Caught"	Chad Hanks; Cameron Heacock; David Rogers	4:56
5.	"Self"		4:21
6.	"Just So You Know"	Hanks; Heacock; Wayne Kile	5:31
7.	"Seamless"		4:28
8.	"Effigy 23"		4:10
9.	"Americunt Evolving Into Useless Psychic Garbage"		2:33
10.	"Shutdown"		5:06
11.	"We Believe"		3:15
12.	"Breathe In, Bleed Out"	Hanks; Heacock; Kile	4:27
13.	"Fall"	Hanks; Heacock; Rogers	4:29
14.	"Reach and Touch"		3:54
15.	"All Wrapped Up"		3:27
16.	"Nothing Gets Nothing"	Hanks; Heacock; Kile	5:30

- Track 9 is titled "Title of Song Removed for Your Safety" on the rear cover.

Bonus track
No.	Title	Music	Length
17.	"Pretty Face" (Japanese edition bonus track)	Hanks, Heacock	11:20

== Music videography ==
Video still	Release date	Song	Director	Label	Additional information
	2001	"All Wrapped Up"	Thomas Migone	American Recordings	Features actor Michael Rooker. It was banned due to visceral images within the video
	2002	"Just So You Know"	Kevin Kerslake	American Recordings	American Head Charge's first official music video

== Credits ==
Personnel per liner notes.

=== American Head Charge ===
- Cameron Heacock – vocals
- Chad Hanks – bass, guitar, programming
- Justin Fowler – keyboards, samples
- David Rogers – guitar
- Wayne Kile – guitar
- Aaron Zilch – samples, programming
- Chris Emery – drums

=== Other personnel ===
- Rick Rubin – producer
- Billy Bowers – editing
- Lindsay Chase – project coordinator
- Rich Costey – remixing, mixing
- Greg Fidelman – engineer
- Dean Karr – photography
- Steve Mixdorf – engineer
- Marc Moreau – editing
- Jeremy Parker – assistant engineer
- Gary Richards – manager
- Eddy Schreyer – mastering
- Justin Smith – mixing, remix assistant

== Chart positions ==
Chart performance for The War of Art
Chart (2001–2002)	Peak position
Scottish Albums (OCC)	81
UK Albums (OCC)	90
US Billboard 200	118
US Top Heatseekers Albums (Billboard)	1

== Release history ==
Region	Date	Label	Format	Ref.
United States	August 28, 2001	American/Island Def Jam	CD; cassette	
United Kingdom	August 28, 2001	American/Mercury	CD; cassette	
Various	April 8, 2022	Music on Vinyl	2xLP	
