= Nattramn =

Swedish black metal and ambient musician

- Born: Mikael Nilsson (unconfirmed); September 7, 1975 (unconfirmed); Markaryd, Småland, Sweden
- Origin: Småland, Sweden
- Genres: Black metal, dark ambient, drone
- Occupations: Singer, writer
- Instruments: Vocals, keyboards
- Years active: 1994–present
- Label: Prophecy Productions

Nattramn is a Swedish musician and author. He is best known for his vocal performance in the band Silencer. On Silencer's sole album, Death – Pierce Me, Nattramn used a bizarre style consisting of high-pitched shrieking and other extreme vocal techniques, allegedly exacerbated by self-harming while recording.

Little is known regarding the identity of Nattramn due to his choosing to live his life in anonymity. His age is disputed (with his date of birth either given as September 7, 1975, or September 7, 1977) and his birth name is not confirmed – all that is known of him are the promotional photographs taken during his time as a member of Silencer, in which his face is entirely covered by bloodied bandages, and some later self-released photos in which his face is also obscured. He is thought to have been born in Markaryd, Småland, Sweden.

== Life and career ==
Virtually nothing is known about Nattramn that predates Silencer's existence as a band.

Silencer was formed in 1995 as a solo project of guitarist/bassist Andreas Casado, under the pseudonym Leere. At some point prior to 1998, Nattramn was enlisted as the band's vocalist and lyricist. With this lineup, they recorded and released a single demo track with session drummer Jonas Mattsson. Following this, Silencer recorded and released the full-length album Death – Pierce Me.

While recording the vocal parts on the album, Nattramn allegedly self-harmed; cutting his wrists and hands. This contributed to his unique high-pitched wailing vocal style, which has been likened to the sounds of a dying animal.

After the release of this album, it is rumoured that Nattramn entered Sankt Sigfrids sjukhus, a psychiatric hospital located in Växjö, although the circumstances surrounding his admission, and whether he was sectioned or went voluntarily, are subject to conjecture. It is said that following his stay, Nattramn chose to continue to live in Växjö.

After several years of inactivity, he created the dark ambient solo project Diagnose: Lebensgefahr and released an album, entitled Transformalin, in 2007. In 2012 he released a new piece of music entitled "Ödelagt", under the project name Trencadis. This 21-minute piece is described as the beginning of Nattramn's musical career, and was initially written and recorded several years prior to his joining Silencer. The track was said to have been written in 1994, under the project name Sinneskross, and is also in a dark ambient style which has been described as being reminiscent of Burzum.

He wrote a book, which was released in September 2011, entitled Grishjärta ("Pig's Heart"). It was published in Swedish and English, and contains new photos of Nattramn, as well as his artwork and poetry.

== Discography ==
As Trencadis

- 1996 – Ödelagt

With Silencer

- 2001 – Death – Pierce Me

As Diagnose: Lebensgefahr

- 2007 – Transformalin

== Bibliography ==
As Nattramn

- 2011 – Grishjärta
