= A Band Called Pain =

American heavy metal band

- Also known as: ABCP
- Origin: Oakland, California, USA
- Genres: Heavy metal
- Years active: 2001–2010; 2021–present; (Reunion: 2019)
- Label: Hieroglyphics Imperium Recordings
- Members: Allen Richardson; Shaun Bivens; Bryan "Dark Kent" Dean; Tony Providence
- Past members: Akili "Killz Atwillz" Peyton
- Website: A Band Called Pain.com

A Band Called Pain (abbreviated ABCP) are an American heavy metal band from Oakland, California.

The band was formed by cousins Allen Richardson (also known as Allen Anthony formerly of the Roc-A-Fella Records R&B group Christion) and Shaun Bivens who both hail from the San Francisco Bay Area. The band's debut studio album Broken Dreams was released in 2006, and was dubbed one of the ten best (#6) California albums of the year by Zero Magazine. The first single from the album is the song "The Pieces". The song has a music video as well. The band's song "Holy" appeared on the Saw II soundtrack.

A Band Called Pain is also notable for being a rare heavy metal band consisting of four African American members. Guitarist Bivens alluded to this saying:

We could have easily gone down the hip-hop or R&B route and each of us at one time or another given it a shot. We could be making raps about growing up in the hood and gang violence, but that's just not who we are. We're four guys who grew up loving heavy metal, so that's what we play. For us, it is the song that matters most.

The band is also the only heavy metal act released on the independent, alternative hip hop label, Hieroglyphics Imperium Recordings.

ABCP has performed at the South By Southwest festival in Austin, Texas.

In October 2008, Tony Providence left the band and was replaced by Akili Peyton the following year.

Sometime after 2010, the band decided to take a hiatus to focus on other musical projects.

In January 2019, A Band Called Pain announced a one-off reunion show at The Uptown Nightclub in Oakland, California with the original line up on March 30, 2019.

On January 10, 2021, guitarist Shaun Bivens announced on Facebook that A Band Called Pain is recording their first EP, titled "56 Down", since the release of "Beautiful Gun" back in 2010. On March 26, "56 Down" was released to the public. It is currently unknown if this will be a full return of the band.

== Members ==
=== Lineup ===
- Allen Richardson — vocals (2001–2010, 2019, 2021–present)
- Shaun Bivens — guitars (2001–2010, 2019, 2021–present)
- Bryan "Dark Kent" Dean — bass (2001–2010, 2019, 2021–present)
- Tony Providence — drums (2001–2008, 2019, 2021–present)

=== Former members ===
- Akili "Killz Atwillz" Peyton — drums (2009–2010)

== Discography ==
- Broken Dreams (2005)
- Beautiful Gun (2010)
- 56 Down - EP (2021)
