= American Head Charge =

American nu metal band

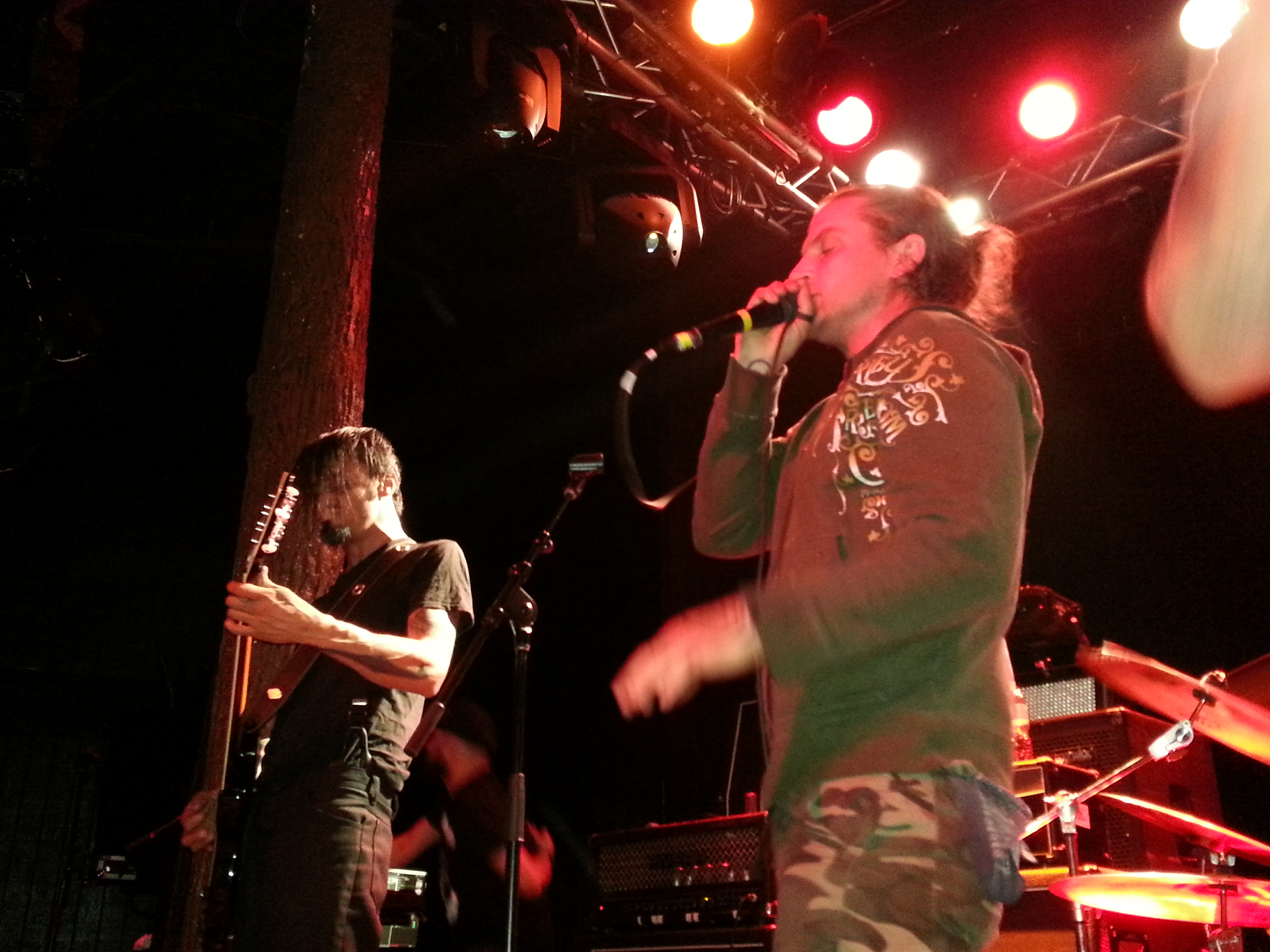
- American Head Charge performing in 2014

Background information
- Also known as: Head Charge; AHC
- Origin: Minneapolis, Minnesota, U.S.
- Genres: Nu metal; alternative metal; industrial metal
- Years active: 1996–2009; 2011–2017
- Labels: American; DRT; Nitrus; Dead Sound; Napalm
- Past members: Cameron Heacock; Justin Fowler; Karma Singh Cheema; Benji Helberg; Jeremiah Stratton; Chad Hanks (deceased); Bryan Ottoson (deceased); Dane Tuders; Aaron Zilch; Dave Rogers; Peter Harmon; Wayne Kile; Nick Quijano; Sin Quirin; Ted Hallows; Chris Emery
- Website: headcharge.com

American Head Charge was a nu metal band from Minneapolis, Minnesota. The band has earned two nominations at the Kerrang! Awards.

== History ==
=== Formation (1996–1999) ===
Early incarnations of the band sported names such as Flux, Gestapo Pussy Ranch, and Warsaw Ghetto Pussy, although these were short-lived. The name Flux was already adopted by another band and so was dropped due to the chance of copyright infringement and libel, while the latter names were abandoned within a period of six months so as not to alienate prospective label interest. "I'm a fan of 3-word names", Hanks said in a December 2001 ConcertLivewire.com interview. In reference to the band name, he confessed; "It means nothing. No meaning by it. Pretty much that purpose right there." Although sometimes speculated that their name was taken from Adrian Sherwood's famous dub label On-U Sound act African Head Charge, which was formed in the early 1980s, it is in fact a coincidence. Chad Hanks remarked in an interview before they were signed that, "It turns out that there is actually a band called African Head Charge; it's so hard to be original these days."

=== Trepanation (1999–2000) ===
After settling on the name American Head Charge, the band made their debut on the underground industrial metal scene with their 1999 independent self-released album Trepanation. The personnel on the album saw Heacock and Hanks (now respectively re-christened Martin Cock and Banks) joined by guitarist David Rogers, Peter Harmon on drums, and Christopher Emery on keyboards/samplers. Further exposure came through two track offerings to Dwell Records tribute albums, namely in homage to industrial bands Ministry and Marilyn Manson. Second guitarist Wayne Kile, keyboard player Justin Fowler and sampler/sound programmer Aaron Zilch joined the ranks during mid/late 1999, while Peter Harmon parted ways from the band and Chris Emery took over the vacant drum position.

After supporting System of a Down in Des Moines, Iowa in August 1999, System of a Down's bassist Shavo Odadjian was impressed enough that when American Recordings label owner Rick Rubin asked Odadjian if there were any bands he should check out, he told Rubin about American Head Charge. Six months later the band was offered a record deal with Rick's American Recordings, then under the Columbia Records umbrella.

=== The War of Art (2000–2002) ===
After the local success of Trepanation and their signing to American Recordings in 2000, the band moved to Los Angeles to begin work on their first major-label album with producer Rick Rubin at the helm, living and recording at his Houdini Mansion. The War of Art, released August 28, 2001, sold over 12,000 copies in the United States in its first week and went on to sell over 250,000. However, like many "heavy" bands at the time, sales of the album suffered immediately after the 9/11 attacks.

American Head Charge, commencing a live schedule in support of the album, began their professional touring experience on Ozzy Osbourne's 2001 Ozzfest, playing third on the "Second Stage" for the entire tour. They then got a slot on the Pledge of Allegiance festival tour, headlined by Slipknot, No One, Mudvayne, Rammstein, and System of a Down. Guitarist Dave Rogers marked their concluding show of this tour in New Jersey by playing the entire concert naked; this led to his subsequent arrest. In December 2001, the band co-supported Slayer alongside Ohio groove metal band Chimaira for the first two months of the American God Hates Us All tour. Subsequent shows were headlined by Kittie, hardcore punk band Biohazard, and Texan stoner rockers Speedealer, preceding a four-month Scandinavian/European/UK/Japanese tour headlined by Slipknot.

Guitarist Wayne Kile departed the band in early April 2002, paving the way for former Black Flood Diesel guitarist Bryan Ottoson. Just 24 hours after getting the offer to join, Ottoson flew to Los Angeles and took part in the filming of the music video for "Just So You Know".

=== The Feeding (2002–2007) ===
After a two-year hiatus, drugs had taken control of much of the band. According to their MySpace page, three members of the band had become chemically dependent, with two of them going back into rehab. Guitarist Bryan Ottoson even stated that the band looked so doomed that he was almost checked into a mental institution for fear of suicide. The band started writing and recording.

During the demo process, The War of Art producer Rick Rubin became increasingly elusive, and the band subsequently asked to be let out of their recording contract. Rubin respected their request without any legal squabbles. In July 2004, the band signed with DRT Entertainment. The band's producer on The Feeding was The War of Art's engineer Greg Fidelman. American Head Charge recorded for four months, feeling this was by far their most disciplined record to date. The Feeding was released on February 15, 2005. The Feeding spawned one radio single "Loyalty". They also recorded a music video for the song "Cowards", featuring former UFC fighter Chuck Lidell.

Bassist Chad Hanks later stated in a 2011 interview that the band never received royalties from their label for The Feeding.

==== Death of guitarist Bryan Ottoson ====
Guitarist Bryan Ottoson (1978–2005)

Guitarist Bryan Ottoson died on April 19, 2005, at the age of 27 in the middle of a tour conducted with the bands Mudvayne, Life of Agony, and Bloodsimple. The musician's body was found lying on a sleeping bunk on the band's tour bus in North Charleston, South Carolina, where the group was scheduled to perform at the Plex club. According to North Charleston police documents, scene investigators concluded the guitarist's death was the result of an accidental prescription drug overdose. Police discovered a pill bottle of "amounts of prescription medicine" in Ottoson's bunk. Ottoson had been battling severe strep throat with prescribed penicillin, and he was also given an unnamed pain medication.

Band members informed police they last saw Ottoson alive around 4 a.m. on April 18, 2005, as they went to sleep before leaving Jessup, Maryland. Ottoson had consumed "a large amount of alcohol at a bar" in Jessup that evening, according to police documents. This statement is reported as inaccurate by bassist/co-founder Chad Hanks: "Bryan, myself, and our tech D-Rock walked to the bar just before last call, and we were stone cold sober. We all had two shots of vodka and one beer each. No more. No less. If 3 drinks is a 'large amount of alcohol', then apparently my mother is a raging alcoholic." Police were called to the scene around 6:30 p.m., April 19, 2005, and Ottoson was deceased by this time. Hanks and Cheema remarked to police that "Ottoson was a heavy sleeper, and it was not uncommon for him to sleep late before a concert."

=== Can't Stop The Machine (2007) ===
On April 3, 2007, American Head Charge released their first DVD Can't Stop the Machine, through Nitrus Records. Along with it came a 10 track CD with live and unreleased songs, including a remix of The War of Art single, "Just So You Know". They supported the release with a two-month U.S. tour that began on May 5 with their ninth sold-out First Avenue show. They played an "encore performance" of the tour's final sold-out show at The Rock in Maplewood, Minnesota on September 14, 2007. This would be their last live show together.

=== Hiatus (2007–2011) ===
Updates from the band between 2007-2009 were sporadic at best, though Chad Hanks regularly kept fans updated through his personal blog. In August 2008, he commented that drugs had once again become an obstacle for the band, with Hanks himself claiming to have become sober again in winter 2007, while Cameron Heacock waited until April 2008 to attend a treatment facility in California.

In September 2008, the members of American Head Charge reconvened in a Los Angeles recording studio to resume work on their fourth studio album. While most of the band spent a week in the studio together, vocalist Cameron Heacock only spent 3 days with the band. Chad Hanks reported that the band had recorded one full song and started working on two further demos.

With his newfound sobriety, Heacock found himself struggling with writer's block and unable to find an adequate balance between creativity and maintaining sobriety. In April 2009, Heacock agreed to spend some time in Minneapolis with Hanks as a means of supporting his creativity and sobriety. However, he never showed up.

On August 11, 2009, the band issued a press release, stating the band had disbanded. The press release cited singer Cameron Heacock's "inability to continue on a musical career path." "This is not the kind of news I enjoy being the bearer of, but we've been ready and waiting for input from Cameron for almost two years; we've written and recorded two albums worth of material in that time." said co-founder and bassist Chad Hanks. "At this point, he no longer gives being in this band any sort of top priority, which is so sad seeing as how he has such an amazing and unique voice; I couldn't wait to hear it on these songs. "However, we're looking forward to some new blood; a young, hungry soul that doesn't sound like anyone else and is ready to work his ass off. We're more than eager to get back to the mines. This is what we do."

American Head Charge received over 300 submissions from hopeful vocalists after the departure of Heacock, which were described as mostly "horrible" by bassist Hanks. However, the band did spend some time working with two different singers: the first was Dennis Sanders Jr. who played with Black Light Burns at the time. Some demos were recorded with Sanders, but it was ultimately decided that he wouldn't be able to fully commit to the band as he was more interested in working on solo material. Josh Bradford from Revolting Cocks was later brought into the band but, according to Hanks, the relationship ultimately "petered out" due to Hanks' personal issues.

In a bizarre twist for the band, vocalist Cameron Heacock rejoined the band via a short email to Hanks. After two years of silence, Heacock emailed Hanks with one of the demos he'd be sent in 2007, with his vocals added to the mix. The next day, Hanks received two more demos with Heacock's recorded vocals.

"After not hearing from him for almost two years, he contacted me via email, completely out of the blue, with one of the demos I had sent him two-and-a-half years prior…with his vocals recorded on top of it. You have to remember, I closed-up shop on this motherf***** [the band]. Like, there was a ‘closed’ sign in the window; the whole shebang. And then the next day, two more arrived in my inbox, and then two more after that. The weirdest thing was, that in his first email, there was no pleasantries, no ‘Hey man, I know we haven’t spoken in two years…’. It was just ‘Here’s (name of song). I think the second verse should be twice as long’. It was a very odd but interesting way to get my attention, to say the least!” - Bassist Chad Hanks on how vocalist Cameron Heacock rejoined the band.

On January 18, 2011, American Head Charge's long dormant MySpace page showed a new status update, "Stranger things have happened...", grouped with a new background and a new icon showing a disembodied hand breaking out of the ground. The name on the page was changed from "RIP American Head Charge: 1998–2009" to "American Head Charge". However, since April 17, 2011, the name on the page again showed as "RIP American Head Charge: 1998–2009", refuting the possibility of a reunion for the time being. In the following months, bassist Chad Hanks made posts on his Twitter page, saying that the band is back together with guitarist Karma Cheema, drummer Chris Emery, vocalist Cameron Heacock, keyboardist Justin Fowler and himself. "Rehearsals are tentatively scheduled for July/August" posted Hanks on his Twitter page.

=== Reunion and Shoot (2011–2013) ===
On June 30, 2011, bassist Chad Hanks announced the band planned on rehearsing again and making more music. Furthermore, he advertised the band's official Facebook account "American Head Charge (Official)".

On October 6, 2011, the band posted on their Official Facebook page that Sin Quirin, former guitarist of Ministry, Revolting Cocks, and Society 1, will be featured on their upcoming "tourette" as a second guitarist. In October 2011, American Head Charge embarked on their "tourette" with supporting acts Wrecking Day, Gabriel and the Apocalypse, and Dead Horse Trauma. It was announced on February 29, 2012, that American Head Charge will participate in the Hed2Head Tour 3 supporting Mushroomhead and (Hed) PE.

Subsequently, the band recorded the EP Shoot (initially planned to be called Interstice). The EP's first single called "Sugars of Someday" was released on iTunes May 9, 2012. The band said that proceeds will go towards funding the next album.

Interestingly, Sugars of Someday was originally written in 2008 during the band's period of inactivity. Both replacement vocalists that had worked with the band during Cameron Heacock's absence wrote and recorded their own versions of the song before Heacock ultimately returned to the band and wrote his own version.

The five-song Shoot EP was self-released July 23, 2013, with a national tour starting two weeks later. Part 2 of the Shoot tour hit the UK and included a second leg tour of the US.

The track listing for Shoot includes the previously released single, "Sugars of Someday", the three new songs "Writhe", "Set Yourself on Fire", and "Sand", as well as a cover of the Patti Smith song "Rock N Roll Nigger".

=== Resurgence and Tango Umbrella (2013–2017) ===
In March 2014, the band started an Indiegogo campaign to raise funds to finance the recording of their fourth studio album, the first full-length recording since 2005's "The Feeding". Dave Fortman had been tapped to produce the album. The band raised $53,370 exceeding the initial goal of $46,000. The band offered fans everything from downloads of new songs, pre-orders of the new album, signed gear and handwritten lyrics, (V)VIP access to shows, name in the album credits, personal lessons, a chance to perform with the band and guestlist for life. One contributor donated to get the band to play their zombie themed wedding reception.

Following the success of the campaign, the band played multiple shows with Wayne Static and performed at the Download Festival in June 2014. Following the Download performance and a few dates in the UK, the band holed up in Kentucky at Third Sky Studios to record the long-awaited full-length record.

In October 2014, the band accompanied Soil, Hed P.E. and Wolfborne on a tour across Europe and the UK. The band was set to go on a tour a week after returning to the states with Wolfborne and joining Wayne Static and Powerman 5000 for a multi city US tour. Due to the death of Wayne Static on November 1, the bands regrouped and decided to continue with the tour in Wayne's memory.

After 6 months filled with recording and touring, the band took time off with a "Holiday Hangover" show on December 27, 2014, planned for Minneapolis' Turf Club. The band teased a big announcement for December 9 via Facebook On December 9, the band confirmed a two-month spring tour with Coal Chamber, Filter and Combichrist.

American Head Charge released their new album, Tango Umbrella, on March 25, 2016, via Napalm Records. Four months later on July 15, 2016, Ted Hallows and Chris Emery both quit the band, announcing their departures on Facebook without consulting Hanks or Heacock beforehand.

=== Death of co-founder/bassist Hanks, arrest of Heacock ===
On November 12, 2017, founding bass player Chad Hanks died at the age of 46, after being diagnosed with a terminal illness. A benefit and memorial concert to Hanks was held on Sunday, November 26, 2017, at the iconic First Avenue Mainroom in Minneapolis, MN, just two weeks after his death. The concert featured a special performance from Head Charge, with current and former members; Cameron Heacock, Justin Fowler, Karma Cheema, Aaron Zilch, Benji Helberg, and Dane Tuders playing with the band. Chad's bass tech Jordan Swanson, played bass along with special appearances from his longtime friends Greg Chilton, Jake "Tox" Crooks, and Vince Ebertz all performing vocals on select songs. The show also saw sets from Blue Felix, Black Flood Diesel, The Omega Sequence, Outside The Murder, Strate Jak It, and DJ Aaron Zilch, all of which were handpicked to play by Hanks himself before his passing. A special tribute performance from Chad's former School of Rock students playing two of his favorite songs, "Land of Sunshine" by Faith No More, and "Strutter" by Kiss also took place. The performance is the band's last to date.

On April 11, 2018, vocalist Cameron Heacock was arrested in Costa Mesa, California while driving an allegedly stolen van full of stolen items, including over a dozen guitars, nine of which were lifted from a Guitar Center in Fountain Valley. A stolen motorbike and more items were also found in the van.

American Head Charge had been planning on performing some shows in 2020, but they were cancelled due to the COVID-19 pandemic. A 2023 retrospective on the band by the website Racket states that its members have moved on to other jobs, with Fowler declaring it to be "done".

In an interview with Youtube channel Soft White Underbelly in November 2025, Heacock discussed the band's beginning, the loss of his bandmates, and his struggle with addiction and homelessness. In the video, Heacock said he spent several months in prison and was living on the streets in Los Angeles, but still hoped to make more music in the future. After the video's release, fans searched to help Heacock, raising money to offer him assistance both in housing and sobriety. In July 2026, Heacock was admitted into municipal housing.

Both The Feeding and War of Art reappeared on streaming services in May 2026. Prior to this, the band signed with Barney Cronen of Regime Music group, who has been looking after the catalogue, estate and re-release of The Feeding.

== Honors and awards ==
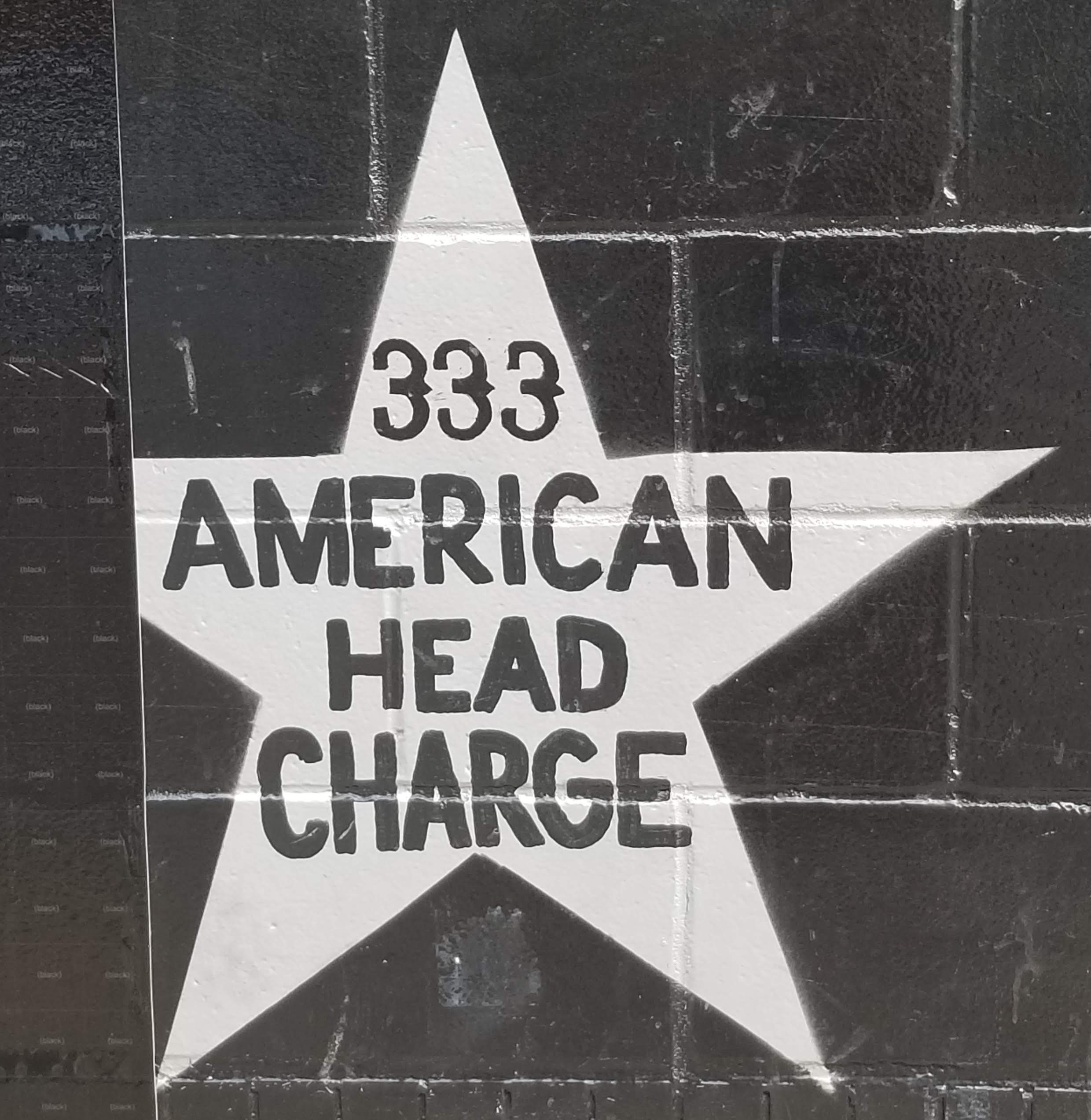
Star honoring American Head Charge on the outside mural of the Minneapolis nightclub First Avenue

American Head Charge has been honored with a star on the outside mural of the Minneapolis nightclub First Avenue, recognizing performers that have played sold-out shows or have otherwise demonstrated a major contribution to the culture at the iconic venue. Receiving a star "might be the most prestigious public honor an artist can receive in Minneapolis," according to journalist Steve Marsh.

== Band members ==
Final lineup

- Cameron Heacock – vocals (1996–2009, 2011–2017)
- Chad Hanks (Banks) – bass (1996–2009, 2011–2017; his death)
- Justin Fowler – keyboards, samples, backing vocals (1999–2009, 2011–2017)
- Karma Singh Cheema – guitar (2004–2005, 2007–2009, 2011–2017)
- Benji Helberg – guitar (2005–2009, 2016–2017)
- Jeremiah "Major Trauma" Stratton – drums (2016–2017)

Former

- Peter Harmon – drums (1996–1999)
- Dave Rogers – guitar (1996–2003)
- Chris Emery – keyboards, samples (1996–1999), drums (1999–2006, 2011–2016)
- Wayne Kile – guitar (1999–2002)
- Aaron Zilch – samples (1999–2003, one-off 2017)
- Bryan Ottoson – guitar (2002–2005; his death)
- Nick Quijano – guitar (2005–2007)
- Dane Tuders – drums (2006–2009, one-off 2017)
- Sin Quirin – guitar (2011–2012)
- Ted Hallows – guitar (2013–2016)

Live musicians

- Anthony Burke – guitar (2006, 2012)
- Krister Pihl - guitar (2012)
- Michael Dwyer - bass (2017)
- Jordan Swanson - bass (2017)

== Discography ==
=== Studio albums ===
List of albums, with selected chart positions
| Title | Album details | Peak chart positions | | | | | | | Sales |
| Title | Album details | US | US Heat | US Indie | US Rock | SCO | UK | UK Rock | Sales |
|---|---|---|---|---|---|---|---|---|---|
| Trepanation | Released: July 1999; Label: Independent; Formats: CS, CD, DL | — | — | — | — | — | — | — | |
| The War of Art | Released: August 28, 2001; Label: American Recordings; Formats: CS, CD, 2xLP, DL | 118 | 1 | — | — | 81 | 90 | 11 | US: 136,000; WW: 250,000 |
| The Feeding | Released: February 15, 2005; Label: DRT Entertainment/Nitrus; Formats: CD, DL | — | 11 | 15 | — | — | 115 | 7 | |
| Tango Umbrella | Released: March 25, 2016; Label: Napalm; Formats: CD, DL | — | 8 | 30 | 43 | — | — | 16 | |

=== EPs ===
| Title | Album details |
|---|---|
| Shoot | Released: July 23, 2013; Label: Dead Sound; Formats: CD, DL |

=== DVD ===
List of albums, with selected chart positions
| Title | Album details | Peak chart positions |
| Title | Album details | US Heat |
|---|---|---|
| Can't Stop the Machine | Released: April 3, 2007; Label: Nitrus; Formats: CD, DVD, DL | 31 |

=== Singles ===
| Title | Year | Peak chart positions | | | Album |
| Title | Year | SCO | UK | UK Rock | Album |
|---|---|---|---|---|---|
| "Just So You Know" | 2002 | 44 | 52 | 3 | The War of Art |
| "All Wrapped Up" | 2002 | — | — | — | The War of Art |
| "Loyalty" | 2005 | — | — | — | The Feeding |
| "Sugars of Someday" | 2012 | — | — | — | Shoot EP |
| "Drowning Under Everything" | 2017 | — | — | — | Tango Umbrella |
"—" denotes the release did not chart.

=== Music videos ===
| Song | Director | Album | Label | Additional information |
|---|---|---|---|---|
| "Just So You Know" | Kevin Kerslake | The War of Art | American Recordings | American Head Charge's first official music video. |
| "All Wrapped Up" | Thomas Mignone | The War of Art | American Recordings | Banned due to visceral images within video. |
| "Loyalty" | Mike Sloat | The Feeding | DRT Entertainment/Nitrus | First official music video release taken from The Feeding. |
| "Cowards" | Mike Sloat | The Feeding | DRT Entertainment/Nitrus | First unofficial music video release taken from The Feeding. Features UFC fighter Chuck Liddell. |
| "Perfectionist" | | Tango Umbrella | Napalm Records | First official lyric music video release taken from Tango Umbrella. |
| "Let All the World Believe" | Bobby Czzowitz | Tango Umbrella | Napalm Records | First official music video release taken from Tango Umbrella. |
| "Drowning Under Everything" | Paul von Stoetzel | Tango Umbrella | Napalm Records | Second official music video release taken from Tango Umbrella. |

=== Compilation appearances ===
| Release date | Title | Album | Label | Additional information |
|---|---|---|---|---|
| January 25, 2000 | "Filth Pig" | Devilswork: A Tribute to Ministry | Dwell Records | Ministry cover |
| June 6, 2000 | "Irresponsible Hate Anthem" | Anthems of Rust and Decay: A Tribute to Marilyn Manson | Dwell Records | Marilyn Manson cover |
| August 25, 2001 | "Reach and Touch" (Live) | Ozzfest 2001: The Second Millennium | Sony Records | |
| March 26, 2002 | "Seamless" (Live) | Pledge of Allegiance Tour: Live Concert Recording | Columbia Records | |
| August 24, 2004 | "Cowards" | UFC: Ultimate Beatdowns, Vol. 1 | DRT Entertainment | First taste of The Feeding. Different from the album version mix. |
