= Just So You Know (American Head Charge song) =

"Just So You Know (single)"

Single by American Head Charge

from the album The War of Art
- Released: May 27, 2002
- Recorded: 2002
- Genre: Nu metal
- Length: 5:32
- Label: American Recordings
- Songwriters: Heacock, Hanks, Kile
- Producer: Rick Rubin

American Head Charge singles chronology
"Just So You Know (single)" (2002)	"'All Wrapped Up'" (2002)

"Just So You Know" is the first single from the album The War of Art by the alternative metal band American Head Charge. The single contains several remixes of "Just So You Know", and one unreleased track "Real Life". The CD includes the "Just So You Know" music video, directed by Kevin Kerslake, audio clips from "The War of Art", Chad Hanks missive, and American Head Charge wallpapers. It was the last participation of Wayne Kile on guitar, who was replaced by Bryan Ottoson, who appears in the music video. Shawn "Clown" Crahan did one remix on the single.

== Track list ==
Track number	Song	Composer(s)	Time
1.	Just So You Know (Short Attention Span mix)	Heacock, Hanks, Kile	3:53
2.	Just So You Know (Clown No.6 (SlipKnoT) mix)	Heacock, Hanks, Kile	11:56
3.	Just So You Know (Wired All Wrong remix)	Heacock, Hanks, Kile	5:43
4.	Just So You Know (Wired All Wrong edit remix)	Heacock, Hanks, Kile	5:33
5.	Just So You Know (album version)	Heacock, Hanks, Kile	5:10
6.	Real Life (unreleased)	Hanks, Ottoson, Fidelman, Fowler, Heacock	3:48
7.	Just So You Know (video)	Heacock, Hanks, Kile	3:53

== Personnel ==
Cameron Heacock – vocals
Chad Hanks – bass, guitar, programming
Justin Fowler – keyboards, sampling
David Rogers – guitar
Wayne Kile – guitar
Aaron Zilch – keyboards, electronics
Chris Emery – drums
Bryan Ottoson – guitar (on "Real Life" and "Just So You Know" video)

=== Production ===
Rick Rubin – producer
Billy Bowers – editing
Lindsay Chase – project coordinator
Rich Costey – remixing, mixing
Greg Fidelman – engineer
Dean Karr – photography
Steve Mixdorf – engineer
Marc Moreau – editing
Jeremy Parker – assistant engineer
Gary Richards – manager
Eddy Schreyer – mastering
Justin Smith – mixing, remix assistant
Clown – remix
