= Greg Fidelman =

American record producer

- Born: September 4, 1965 (age 59)
- Origin: United States
- Genres: Alternative rock; electronica; thrash metal; hip hop; country
- Occupations: Record mixer; engineer; record producer
- Years active: 1988–present
- Website: gregfidelman.com

Greg Fidelman (born September 4, 1965) is an American record mixer, engineer and record producer. He is a frequent collaborator of producer Rick Rubin, and has worked with many bands in various genres, including Metallica, Black Sabbath, Slipknot, High on Fire, Red Hot Chili Peppers, Bush, Audioslave, Marilyn Manson, Slayer, and System of a Down, but has also worked on albums by U2, Johnny Cash, Neil Diamond and others.

Before going into music engineering, he was the former lead guitarist in the rock band Rhino Bucket, being credited by the name Greg Fields.

== Notable album appearances ==
Date	Album	Artist	Position(s)	Ref
2023	72 Seasons	Metallica	Producer/Mixer	
2020	S&M2	Metallica	Producer/Mixer	
2019	We Are Not Your Kind	Slipknot	Producer/Engineer	
2016	Hardwired... to Self-Destruct	Metallica	Producer/Engineer/Mixer	
2015	Shadowmaker	Apocalyptica	Mixer	
2014	.5: The Gray Chapter	Slipknot	Producer	
2013	13	Black Sabbath	Engineer	
2011	Lulu	Metallica & Lou Reed	Producer/Engineer/Mixer	
2011	I'm with You	Red Hot Chili Peppers	Engineer/Mixer	
2011	21	Adele	Engineer/Mixer	
2010	Snakes for the Divine	High on Fire	Producer/Mixer	
2009	World Painted Blood	Slayer	Producer/Mixer	
2009	Music for Men	The Gossip	Engineer/Mixer	
2008	Angels Undercover	Josiah Leming	Engineer	
2008	Death Magnetic	Metallica	Engineer/Mixer	
2008	The Cross of My Calling	The (International) Noise Conspiracy	Engineer	
2007	Spider-Man 3	Various artists	Engineer (tracks 1, 2, and 12)	
2007	Golden Daze	The Wildbirds	Producer/Mixer	
2007	Don't Dance Rattlesnake	The Films	Mixer	
2006	U218: Singles	U2	Engineer (tracks 17 and 18)	
2006	American V: A Hundred Highways	Johnny Cash	Engineer/Mixer	
2006	Wish	Reamonn	Producer/Mixer	
2005	12 Songs	Neil Diamond	Mixer/Engineer	
2004	Broken Valley	Life of Agony	Producer/Mixer	
2004	The Feeding	American Head Charge	Producer/Mixer/Engineer	
2004	Vol. 3: (The Subliminal Verses)	Slipknot	Engineer/Mixer	
2003	Unearthed	Johnny Cash	Mixer	
2003	Soundtrack to the Apocalypse	Slayer	Mixer (tracks 16–18)	
2003	Get Born	Jet	Engineer	
2003	Life on Other Planets	Supergrass	Mixer/Engineer	
2003	Exactly What You Think It Is	Sour	Producer/Mixer	
2002	Audioslave	Audioslave	Engineer	
2001	Golden State	Bush	Engineer	
2001	Onka's Big Moka	Toploader	Engineer	
2001	The War of Art	American Head Charge	Engineer	
2000	Holy Wood (In the Shadow of the Valley of Death)	Marilyn Manson	Engineer	
2000	Thirteen Tales From Urban Bohemia	The Dandy Warhols	Engineer	
1999	Californication	Red Hot Chili Peppers	Engineer	
1998	System of a Down	System of a Down	Engineer	
1997	Built to Last	Sick of It All	Engineer	
1997	Accident of Birth	Bruce Dickinson	Assistant Engineer	
