= Death – Pierce Me =

Studio album by Silencer
- Released: October 30, 2001
- Genre: Black metal
- Length: 48:57
- Label: Prophecy
- Producer: Markus Stock

Silencer chronology
Death – Pierce Me (demo) (1998)	Death – Pierce Me (2001)

Death – Pierce Me is the only studio album by Swedish black metal act Silencer. Considered to be a cult classic, the album is a landmark of the depressive suicidal black metal genre.

The album saw a re-release in 2006 by Autopsy Kitchen Records. It was re-released again by Lupus Lounge in 2009 with the track "Death – Pierce Me (Demo '98)" as bonus track and in digipack format. A vinyl version was also released by Prophecy Productions.

== Recording ==
Recording sessions included three musicians: Nattramn on vocals, Andreas Casado (under the pseudonym Leere) on guitars and bass, and session member Steve Wolz on drums. An unknown player provided keyboards to the album; although as the demo version of the title track also features piano, it may have been played by Nattramn or Leere.

In efforts to enhance the impact of his vocal delivery on the album, Nattramn allegedly self-harmed while recording his vocals; cutting his wrists and hands. In the small collection of promotional photos from this period, Nattramn only appears with his face obscured, covered in blood and scars.

== Track listing ==
No.	Title	Length
1.	"Death – Pierce Me"	10:33
2.	"Sterile Nails and Thunderbowels"	6:19
3.	"Taklamakan"	8:35
4.	"The Slow Kill in the Cold"	11:37
5.	"I Shall Lead, You Shall Follow"	8:50
6.	"Feeble Are You – Sons of Sion"	3:03

== Personnel ==
Silencer

- Nattramn – vocals
- Andreas "Leere" Casado – guitar, bass

Session musicians

- Steve Wolz – drums

Production and design

- Produced, mixed and mastered by Markus Stock
- Album art and logo by Olaf Eckhardt
- Art direction and design by Christian Söderholm
- Executive design by Łukasz Jaszak
