= Zero Magazine =

American music magazine

- Categories: Music
- Frequency: Monthly
- Founder: Larry Trujillo
- Founded: 1 January 1992; 34 years ago
- First issue: January 1, 1992; 34 years ago
- Final issue: July 1, 2008
- Country: United States
- Based in: San Jose
- Language: English
- Website: zero.cc, then zeromag.net, then zeromag.com. All defunct.

Zero Magazine was an American music magazine from San Jose, California that covered punk, rock, and metal music from the San Francisco Bay Area. It was founded by Larry Trujillo in 1992 and published monthly until July 2008.

SF Weekly said that Zero Magazine "could very well revive local music reporting". The Sacramento State Hornet said it was "one of the most widely known music magazines in the Northern California area".
