= Pledge of Allegiance Tour: Live Concert Recording =

2002 live album by various artists

Live album by Various Artists
- Released: March 26, 2002
- Recorded: June 14, 2001 and October 9, 2001
- Genres: Nu metal, alternative metal
- Label: Columbia

Pledge of Allegiance Tour: Live Concert Recording is a live album by American metal bands System of a Down, Slipknot, Mudvayne, American Head Charge and No One featuring tracks from the Pledge of Allegiance Tour in 2001. The tracks were recorded live at the Allstate Arena in Rosemont, Illinois on October 9, 2001, except the two Mudvayne tracks which were recorded live at the Madison Theater in Peoria, Illinois on June 14, 2001. Rammstein was accompanying these bands on the tour, but for unknown reasons was not included. The main bands that played were Rammstein, Slipknot, and System of a Down. All three bands had albums released or soon to be released.

== Track listing ==
No.	Title	Artist	Length
1.	"Chop Suey!"	System of a Down	3:17
2.	"Bounce"	System of a Down	2:03
3.	"Toxicity"	System of a Down	3:40
4.	"People = Shit"	Slipknot	3:49
5.	"The Heretic Anthem"	Slipknot	4:23
6.	"New Abortion"	Slipknot	4:08
7.	"Under My Skin"	Mudvayne	3:46
8.	"Pharmaecopia"	Mudvayne	5:31
9.	"Seamless"	American Head Charge	5:17
10.	"My Release"	No One	3:25
