= Silencer (band) =

Swedish black metal band

- Origin: Stockholm, Sweden
- Genre: Black metal
- Years active: 1995–2001
- Label: Prophecy
- Members: Nattramn; Andreas Casado; Jonas Mattsson; Steve Wolz

Silencer was a Swedish black metal band. Based in Stockholm, the group formed in 1995 and disbanded in 2001 releasing only one full-length album and a demo. With lyrics revolving around death, misanthropy, insanity, and antisemitism, the group, which consisted of only two official members, was noted for its vocalist, Nattramn, who possessed an eerie screeching vocal style and was allegedly insane. It was speculated that Nattramn was admitted to a psychiatric ward following the release of their full-length album Death – Pierce Me.

Despite their short musical career, Silencer is considered to be one of the most significant bands in the depressive/suicidal black metal subgenre, having achieved a cult following in the black metal underground. The band has never performed live or given any official interviews.

== History ==
=== Early years ===
Silencer was formed in 1995 as a solo project of guitarist/bassist Andreas Casado, under the pseudonym Leere. At some point prior to 1998, Nattramn was enlisted as the band's vocalist and lyricist.

In late 1998, with the help of session drummer Jonas Mattsson, Silencer released their first professional demo, which was composed of a single, eleven-minute song titled "Death – Pierce Me".

=== Death – Pierce Me ===
In July 2000, Silencer began recording their album Death – Pierce Me (2001), which was released by Prophecy Productions. Recording sessions included a total of three members performing on the album, which included Steve Wolz (Bethlehem and Imperia) playing drums. The album also included a re-recording of the "Death – Pierce Me" demo song as the opening track.

The song "Sterile Nails and Thunderbowels" had a promotional video released for it, which features footage from the 1989 experimental horror film Begotten by E. Elias Merhige.

=== Breakup and subsequent projects ===
Following the release of Death – Pierce Me, it is speculated that Nattramn was institutionalised at Sankt Sigfrids sjukhus (English: "Saint Sigfrid's Hospital"), a mental hospital located in Växjö, although there is no conclusive evidence to support this. In 2007, he released a dark ambient solo album called Transformalin, under the project name Diagnose: Lebensgefahr (roughly translated from German as "Diagnosis: Mortal Danger"). Nattramn released a book, Grishjärta (meaning "pig's heart" in Swedish), in 2011, a limited edition work containing his artwork and poetry, and a small selection of new photographs of him – albeit with his face obscured. These, and his promotional photographs from his time in Silencer, in which his face is also obscured, are the only publicly available photographs of Nattramn.

The other member, guitarist/bassist/songwriter Andreas "Leere" Casado, went on to join Shining between 2005 and 2006, under the mononym "Casado". He contributed lyrics to the song "Eradication of the Condition" from the album IV – The Eerie Cold. In 2006, he worked with the band Zavorash, as composer of the song "Worthlessness" from the album Nihilistic Ascension & Spiritual Death as Andreas Casado.

== Discography ==
- Death – Pierce Me (demo, 1998)
- Death – Pierce Me (full-length album, 2001). A version of the full-length album has been available in the past that contains the full album, with the 1998 Death – Pierce Me demo included as a bonus track.

== Members ==
=== Official lineup ===
- Nattramn (1998–2001) – vocals
- Andreas Casado (1995–2001) – guitars, bass

=== Session musicians ===
- Jonas Mattsson – drums (demo, 1998)
- Steve Wolz – drums (studio album, 2001)
