= Racket (Minnesota) =

News website

- Type: News website
- Owner: Writer-owned
- Founded: 2021
- Language: English
- Headquarters: Minneapolis, Minnesota
- Website: www.racketmn.com

Racket is a writer-owned, reader-funded website founded in 2021 by a group of former City Pages editors: Jessica Armbruster, Jay Boller, Em Cassel, and Keith Harris. Racket focuses on local news, politics, music, arts, culture, food and drink, and theater in the Minneapolis–Saint Paul area.

The previous funding model used by Racket's predecessor City Pages, as well as most alt-weekly newspapers, depended largely on advertising, but Racket's founders felt that this model was outmoded. Instead, it is funded largely by reader subscriptions, a model inspired by the earlier success of Defector Media. Racket reported in 2024 that it had generated $322,000 in revenue over the previous year, including $242,000 from subscriptions.

In 2024, Racket won five Page One Awards, given annually for outstanding journalism by the Minnesota Chapter of the Society of Professional Journalists. These included first-place wins for Best Interview (Keith Harris for “My Teen Niece Helps Explain the Taylor Swift Show I Saw on Saturday”) and A&E/Culture Criticism/Reviews (Harris for “I Saw 30 Concerts in 30 Days”). Racket also won four Page One awards in 2023, including first place for Arts & Entertainment Reporting (Jay Boller for “How Music Streaming Impacts Minnesota Musicians“).
