= Envy (band) =

Japanese screamo band

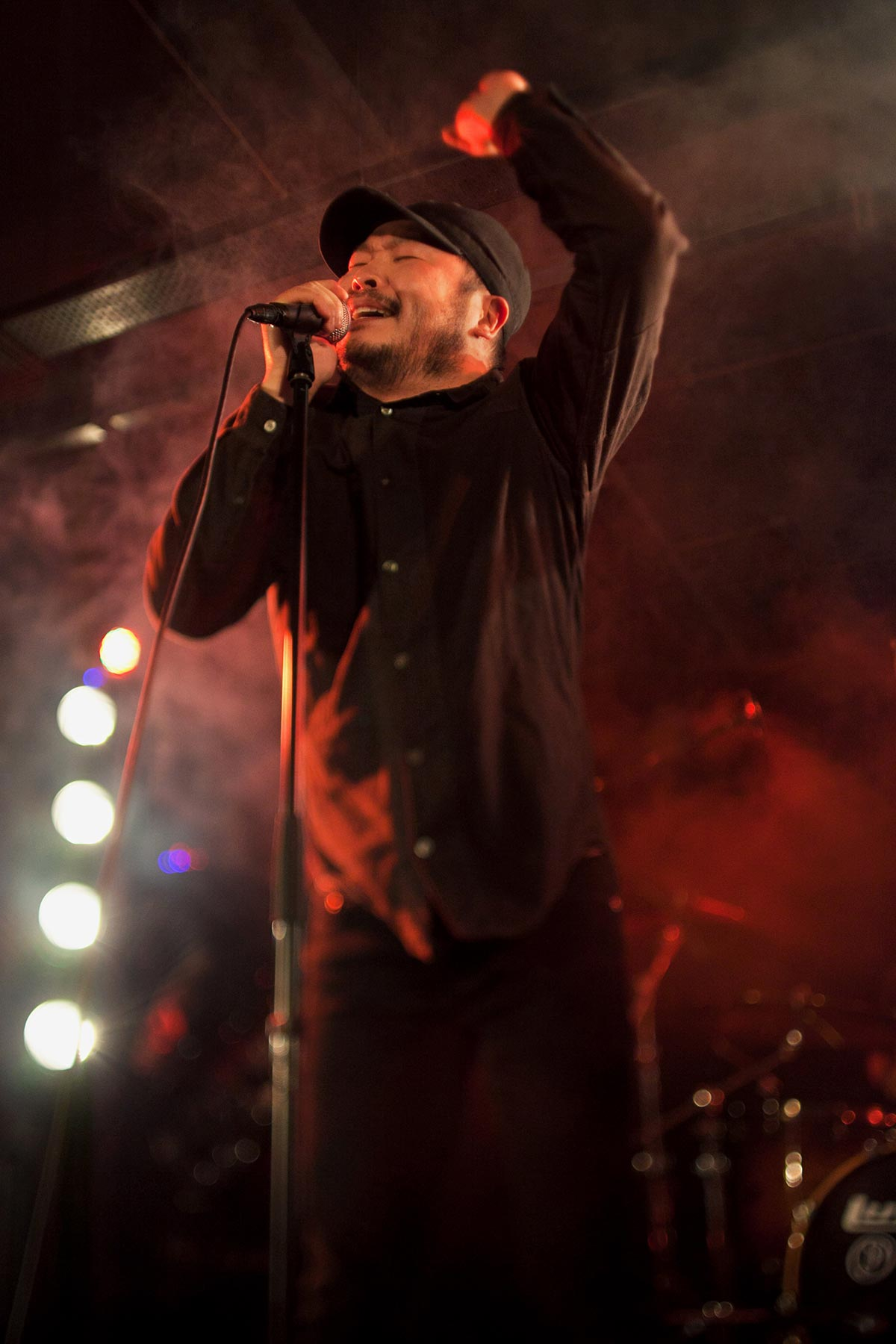
- Tetsuya Fukagawa performing with Envy in Hong Kong in 2011

Background information
- Origin: Tokyo, Japan
- Genres: Screamo; post-hardcore; post-rock
- Years active: 1992–present
- Labels: Temporary Residence Limited; Rock Action; Level Plane
- Members: Tetsuya Fukagawa; Nobukata Kawai; Manabu Nakagawa; Tsuyoshi Yoshitake; Yoshimitsu Taki; Hiroki Watanabe
- Past members: Masahiro Tobita; Dairoku Seki
- Website: www.envybandofficial.com

Envy is a Japanese rock band formed in Tokyo, in 1992. They are signed to Rock Action Records in Europe and Temporary Residence Limited in North America, though originally they worked with Level Plane Records. Initially influential in the post-hardcore and screamo scenes, Envy soon began to employ elements of post-rock in their work as well.

They have released 8 studio albums to date (with the most recent being Eunoia), as well as several EPs and splits, most notably with Jesu and American post-hardcore band Thursday. Original member and vocalist Tetsuya Fukagawa left Envy in 2016.

On February 6, 2018, Envy announced a new lineup consisting of Tsuyoshi Yoshitake, Yoshimitsu Taki, and Hiroki Watanabe. A Japanese press release added that two members had left the band, and founding guitarist and drummer Masahiro Tobita and Dairoku Seki were no longer listed as members on the band's Facebook page or website.

On April 1, 2018, Tetsuya Fukagawa surprise-rejoined Envy on stage for the first time in two and a half years, cementing his return to the band. This was subsequently confirmed via the band's official social media pages.

== Members ==
Current

- Nobukata Kawai — guitar (1992–present)
- Manabu Nakagawa — bass (1992–present)
- Tetsuya Fukagawa — vocals, programming (1992-2016, 2018–present)
- Tsuyoshi "yOshi" Yoshitake — guitar (2018–present)
- Yoshimitsu Taki — guitar (2018–present)
- Hiroki Watanabe — drums (2018–present)

Past

- Masahiro Tobita — guitar (1992–2018)
- Dairoku Seki — drums (1992–2018)

== Discography ==
=== Studio albums ===
- From Here to Eternity (1998)
- All the Footprints You've Ever Left and the Fear Expecting Ahead (2001)
- A Dead Sinking Story (2003)
- Insomniac Doze (2006)
- Recitation (2010)
- Atheist's Cornea (2015)
- The Fallen Crimson (2020)
- Eunoia (2024)

=== EPs ===
- Breathing and Dying in This Place (1996)
- Angel's Curse Whispered in the Edge of Despair (1999)
- The Eyes of Single Eared Prophet (2000)
- Burning Out the Memories 10" (2000)
- Abyssal (2007)
- Alnair in August (2018)
- Definition of Impossibility (2019)
- Seimei (2022)

=== Splits ===
- Split 7" with Sixpence (1997)
- Split 7" with Endeavor (1997)
- Split 7" with This Machine Kills (2000)
- Split 10" with Iscariote (2002)
- Split CD with Yaphet Kotto and This Machine Kills (2003)
- "Envy/Jesu" (2008)
- "Thursday / Envy" (2008)

=== 7"s ===
- Eyes of Final Proof (2000)
- Last Wish (2001)

=== Singles ===
- "As Serenity Calls Your Name" (2011)

=== DVDs ===
- Transfovista DVD (2007)

=== Compilations ===
- Compiled Fragments 1997-2003 (2005)
- Invariable Will, Recurring Ebbs and Flows (2013)
