= All the Footprints You've Ever Left and the Fear Expecting Ahead =

All The Footprints You've Ever Left And The Fear Expecting Ahead

Studio album by Envy
- Released: September 1, 2001 CD (H.G. Fact); November 22, 2001 LP (H.G. Fact)
- Genres: Post-hardcore, hardcore punk, screamo, post-rock
- Length: 49:25
- Language: Japanese
- Labels: H.G. Fact; Dim Mak; Temporary Residence Limited; Rock Action Records

Envy chronology
| Eyes Of A Single-Eared Prophet (2000) | All The Footprints You've Ever Left And The Fear Expecting Ahead (2001) | A Dead Sinking Story (2003) |

All The Footprints You've Ever Left And The Fear Expecting Ahead is an album by Japanese Rock Band Envy. It was released in Japan in 2001 by the label H.G. Fact in both CD and LP formats. Originally, the CD also saw a European release on France's Molaire Industries, and was distributed in the US on indie label Dim Mak. The album, along with A Dead Sinking Story, and Compiled Fragments 1997-2003, was re-released in February 2008 by the band's current US label, Temporary Residence Limited. The album has since been re-released in Europe by Rock Action Records. The album saw a marked change in sound from their previous efforts, and hinted strongly at their current sound.

== Track listing ==
=== CD/digital ===
| No. | Title | Length |
|---|---|---|
| 1. | "Zero" | 2:04 |
| 2. | "Farewell to Words" | 2:45 |
| 3. | "Lies, and Release from Silence" | 4:47 |
| 4. | "Left Hand" | 3:00 |
| 5. | "A Cradle of Arguments and Anxiousness" | 5:24 |
| 6. | "Mystery and Peace" | 6:47 |
| 7. | "Invisible Thread" | 2:42 |
| 8. | "The Spiral Manipulation" | 3:27 |
| 9. | "A Cage It Falls Into" | 6:09 |
| 10. | "The Light of My Footprints" | 4:11 |
| 11. | "Your Shoes and the World to Come" | 8:03 |
| Total length: | | 49:25 |

=== Vinyl LP ===
Side one

| No. | Title | Length |
|---|---|---|
| 1. | "Zero" | 2:04 |
| 2. | "Farewell to Words" | 2:45 |
| 3. | "Lies, and Release from Silence" | 4:47 |
| 4. | "Left Hand" | 3:00 |
| 5. | "A Cradle of Arguments and Anxiousness" | 5:24 |
| 6. | "Mystery and Peace" | 6:47 |

Side two

| No. | Title | Length |
|---|---|---|
| 1. | "Invisible Thread" | 2:42 |
| 2. | "The Spiral Manipulation" | 3:27 |
| 3. | "A Cage It Falls Into" | 6:09 |
| 4. | "The Light of My Footprints" | 4:11 |
| 5. | "Your Shoes and the World to Come" | 8:03 |
| Total length: | | 49:25 |

Some editions include videos for the songs "Left Hand" and "A Cage It Falls Into".
