= From Here to Eternity (Envy album) =

Studio album by Envy
- Released: August 11, 1998 LP & CD (H.G. Fact)
- Genre: Screamo, post-hardcore
- Length: 33:53
- Language: Japanese
- Label: H.G. Fact

Envy chronology
Envy / Endeavor (1997)	From Here to Eternity (1998)	Angel's Curse Whispered in the Edge of Despair (1999)

From Here to Eternity is the debut full-length album and second overall release by Japanese screamo band Envy. It was released in Japan in 1998 by the label H.G. Fact in both CD and LP formats.

== Track listing ==
1. "Limitation" – 4:12
2. "Trembled" – 4:13
3. "A Vicious Circle, Again" – 1:24
4. "Compensation" – 4:08
5. "Off" – 2:40
6. "Crusaders" – 1:59
7. "For You Who Died" – 3:05
8. "Black Past" – 1:54
9. "Grey Wind" – 4:26
10. "Carved Numbers" – 3:38
11. "444 Words" – 2:15

== Personnel ==
- Manabu Nakagawa – Bass
- Dairoku Seki – Drums
- Nobukata Kawai – Guitar
- Masahiro Tobita – Guitar
- Tetsuya Fukagawa – Vocals
- Eiji Tani – Engineering
