= No One (band) =

American nu metal band

- Origin: Chicago, Illinois, United States
- Genres: Nu metal
- Years active: 2000–2003, 2010–2014, 2019 (hiatus)
- Label: Immortal
- Members: Murk (Rick Murawski); Billy K (Billy Kassantis); Knuckles (Rick Oleferchik)
- Past members: B-Larz (Bob Bielarz); Flare (Mike Flaherty)

No One is an American four-piece nu metal band from Chicago, Illinois. They released one studio album through Immortal Records in August 2001 to minimal success. No One has performed on Ozzfest and alongside the likes of Slipknot and System of a Down. After lagging commercial success, the group disbanded in 2003. They reformed in 2010 and began performing concerts again. Two of their members, guitarist B-Larz (Bob Bielarz) and bassist Flare (Mike Flaherty), died in 2014 and 2019 respectively, and No One remains mostly inactive as of 2024.

== Career ==
Vocalist Murk and guitarist B-Larz originally came together in 1994 under the name Black Talon. With the addition of bassist Flare and drummer Billy K, No One was born. They played their first concert on August 5, 2000 at Champ’s. The show occurred between two Chicago dates for Ozzfest, which allowed No One to be exposed to the likes of Disturbed, Soulfly, and The Deadlights. A mere two weeks later, they joined Johnny K to record a three-track demo.

Shortly after, No One received a phone call notifying them that a manager in California had been shopping the demo around without their consent. Although this bothered the Chicago quartet, they soon received offers from various labels. No One eventually chose Immortal Records, partially because at the time Immortal were known for never having dropped a band from its roster. At the time of signing the record deal, No One only had five songs to their name but did not tell the label and wrote the rest of their album in the studio. They released their one and only self-titled album in August 2001 and toured with various popular nu metal groups including Slipknot, System of a Down, and American Head Charge.

The album charted at No. 35 on the Billboard Heatseekers chart but its two singles did not manage to chart. Ironically, Immortal Records saw No One as a major disappointment and soon dropped the band from their roster. Bassist Flare soon exited the group but No One continued to write new music and post demos on their now-defunct website before disbanding in 2003.

As of 2010 the band started playing shows again.

The band's guitarist Bob Bielarz, his wife Viengsavanh "Vee" Malaythong-Bielarz, and his friend Jeremy Muzika, went missing on June 20, 2014, just after 11:00pm, after Bielarz's boat capsized in the Cal-Sag Channel near Palos Hills, Illinois. The bodies of Vee and Jeremy were recovered on June 22. Bielarz was identified on June 23. No One has since been inactive again, and bassist Mike "Flare" Flaherty died on April 1, 2019, following a battle with stage three lung cancer.

== Band members ==
- Murk (Rick Murawski) – vocals
- Billy K (Billy Kassanits) – drums

Past members

- B-Larz (Bob Bielarz) – guitar (2000–2003, 2010–2014; died 2014)
- Flare (Mike Flaherty) – bass (2000–2003, 2010–2014; died 2019)

== Discography ==
Released	Title	Label
August 14, 2001	No One	Immortal Records
2004	Bring That Shit (DVD)	Self Released
February 6, 2024	No One (Digital Re-Release)	Self Released
June 21st, 2024	Redeemer (Single)	Self Released
June 5th, 2025	Let Me In (Single)	Self Released
January 9th, 2026	I Want Everything (Single)	Self Released
February 20th, 2026	Call Me Out (Single)	Self Released
March 27th, 2026	Leech (Single)	Self Released
