= Deadlights (American band) =

American alternative metal band

The Deadlights
- Origin: Long Beach, California, United States
- Genres: Alternative metal, hard rock, nu metal
- Years active: 1998–2001, 2016
- Label: Elektra
- Past members: Wilfred "Duke" Collins; Jimmy Falcone; Billy Roan; Jerry Montano; Sean Delatour

The Deadlights were a short-lived American alternative metal band from Long Beach, California, United States. The band's most notable achievement was playing the second stage at Ozzfest 2000.

The band released one self-titled album on February 22, 2000. The first four tracks ("Bitter", "Amplifier", "Nothing" and "Sweet Oblivion") were released as promotional singles to radio and there was a low-budget video shot for the track "Junk".

== Breakup ==
In early 2001, a message was posted on the band's official web site by frontman Duke.

"Peace to Jim, Jerry and Billy, and much respect goes out to them and whatever they do. As for me, I would like to finally thank all you fans who stuck by us, and continue to show your support for what we were trying to do. It's unfortunate that conditions that we had to face as a band made it impossible for us to keep making music together, but oh well, fuck everyone. As for shit talkers, you can all suck a fat dick. I never gave a fuck about being a rock star, I just wanted to fuck shit up any way I could and will continue to do that. Besides, jealousy will get you nowhere. The real sick motherfuckers know who you are. I'm putting together a new thing, which like everything I've ever done, will be a progression of what I've always been trying to do, which is fuck with your heads any way I can. We all know the record business sucks, but you can't kill what's already dead. DEADLIGHTS rule."

== Aftermath ==
Bassist Jerry Montano went on to play bass in the alternative metal band Nothingface. Later, he played bass for the supergroup Hellyeah, but was fired after assaulting bandmate Tom Maxwell and making gun threats at the band's CD release party.

Lead singer/rhythm guitarist Duke went on to play bass in the groove metal band Droid. He died on March 21, 2015, in Huntington Beach, California. On March 19, 2016, the remaining members of The Deadlights performed a one-off reunion show in memory of Duke, with Sean Delatour filling in on vocals.

== Confusion ==
Note: The Deadlights should not be confused with the newer, four-piece alternative rock band from Lisburn, Northern Ireland. They should also not be confused with the San Diego band, The Deadlites, who toured the US and opened for Cheap Trick, The Plimsouls, Joe Bonamassa, and many others.

== Discography ==
=== Albums ===
- The Deadlights (2000)

=== Singles ===
- "Bitter"
- "Amplifier"
- "Nothing"
- "Sweet Oblivion"

=== Music videos ===
- "Junk"
- "Sweet Oblivion"
