= Suicidal Tendencies discography =

Cataloging of published recordings by Suicidal Tendencies

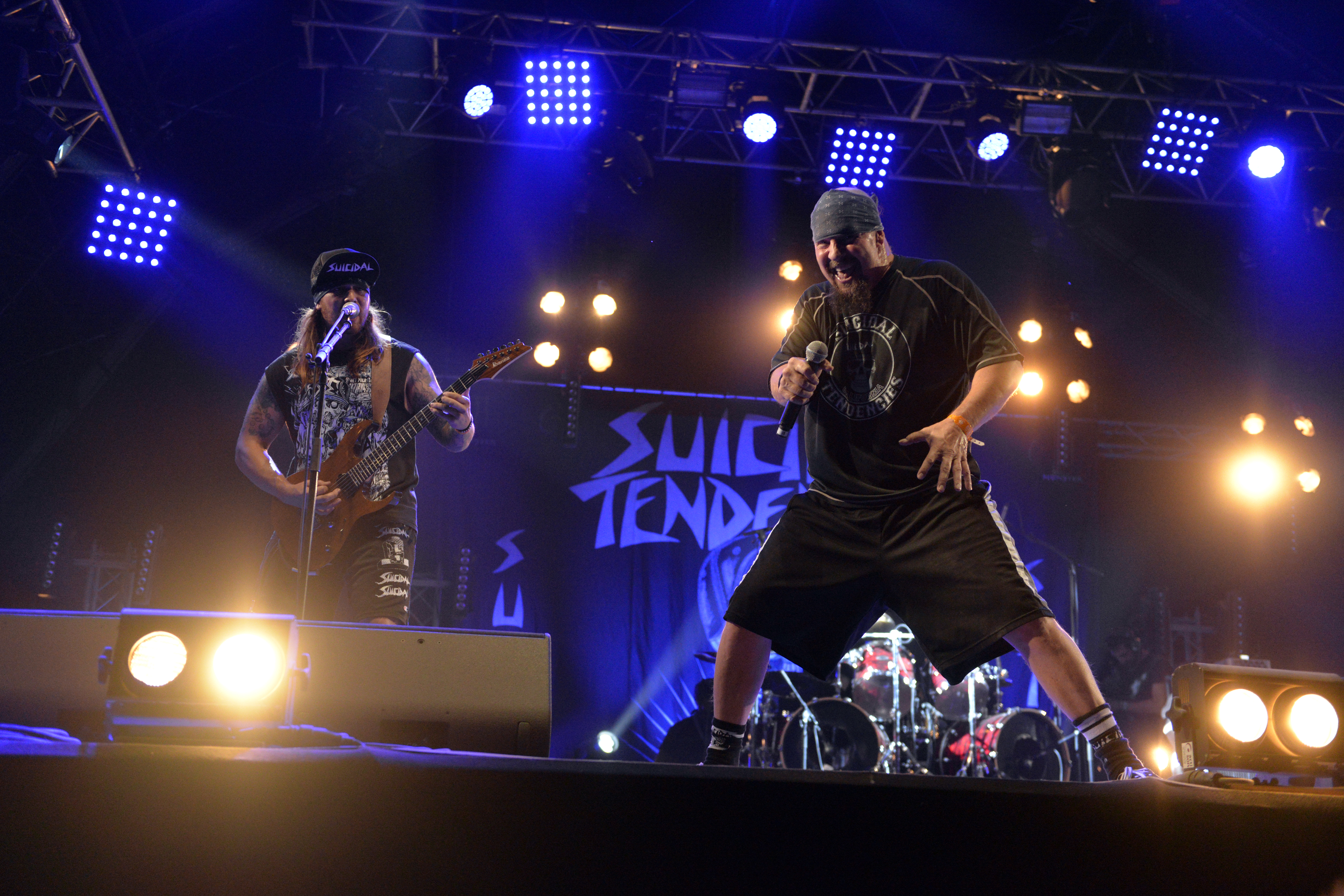
- Suicidal Tendencies at Hellfest 2017
- Studio albums: 14
- Extended plays: 2
- Compilation albums: 4
- Singles: 21
- Video albums: 2
- Music videos: 22

The discography of Suicidal Tendencies, an American crossover thrash band formed in 1980 by vocalist Mike Muir, consists of fourteen studio albums, four compilation albums, two extended plays, twenty-one singles and twenty-two music videos.

The band’s first studio album, Suicidal Tendencies, was released in 1983 to much notoriety in the hardcore punk underground. Their second album, Join the Army, was released four years later and peaked at number 100 in the United States and number 81 in the UK. The album caught the attention of Epic Records, who signed Suicidal Tendencies in 1988. The band released their first album for the label, How Will I Laugh Tomorrow When I Can't Even Smile Today, in September 1988, and in the following year they released Controlled by Hatred/Feel Like Shit... Déjà Vu, which was their first album to be certified gold by the Recording Industry Association of America (RIAA).

Suicidal Tendencies released their fifth album Lights...Camera...Revolution! in July 1990, which peaked at number 101 on the Billboard 200 and number 59 in the UK. It spawned four singles, including "Send Me Your Money", which peaked at number 83 in the UK, leading the album to sell over half a million copies. Their sixth album, The Art of Rebellion, was released in 1992 and peaked at number 52, their highest chart position in their home country to date. It was also the first of five Suicidal Tendencies albums to chart in Germany, as well as their only album to chart in Canada and New Zealand. Four singles were released to promote The Art of Rebellion, including "Nobody Hears" and "I'll Hate You Better", which peaked at number 28 and 34 respectively on the Billboard Mainstream Rock chart. After releasing Still Cyco After All These Years (1993), a re-recording of their first album, Suicidal Tendencies released their eighth studio album Suicidal for Life in 1994. Despite being the band's second highest-charting album in the US, peaking at #82, Suicidal for Life was not as successful as their previous releases, and eventually after touring in support of it, Suicidal Tendencies broke up.

Suicidal Tendencies reformed in 1996, and the compilation album Prime Cuts and split album Friends & Family, Vol. 1 were both released in the following year. They released one EP in 1998, which was followed by Freedumb (1999), their first studio album in five years. After the release of their next album, Free Your Soul and Save My Mind, in 2000, Suicidal Tendencies went on hiatus again and would not release their next studio album until No Mercy Fool!/The Suicidal Family in 2010, which contains mostly re-recordings of Suicidal Tendencies and No Mercy songs. No Mercy Fool!/The Suicidal Family was followed three years later by 13 (2013), which became Suicidal Tendencies' first album to chart on the Billboard 200 since Suicidal for Life but peaked at number 187, making it their second lowest chart position to date. The band's next studio album, World Gone Mad, was released on September 30, 2016, and received their lowest chart position to date on the Billboard 200, peaking at number 192. This was album was followed in 2018 by two releases: one EP (Get Your Fight On!) and an album featuring re-recorded and unreleased material (Still Cyco Punk After All These Years).

== Albums ==
=== Studio albums ===
Year	Album details	Peak chart positions									Certifications
Year	Album details	US	Top Rock Albums	Hard Rock Albums	AUS	CAN	FRA	GER	NZ	UK	Certifications
1983	Suicidal Tendencies: Released: July 5, 1983; Label: Frontier	—	—	—	—	—	—	—	—	—	
1987	Join the Army: Released: April 24, 1987; Label: Caroline	100	—	—	—	—	—	—	—	81	
1988	How Will I Laugh Tomorrow When I Can't Even Smile Today: Released: September 13, 1988; Label: Epic	111	—	—	144	—	—	—	—	—	
1989	Controlled by Hatred/Feel Like Shit... Déjà Vu^{[A]}: Released: October 17, 1989; Label: Epic	150	—	—	—	—	—	—	—	—	RIAA: Gold
1990	Lights...Camera...Revolution!: Released: July 3, 1990; Label: Epic	101	—	—	—	—	—	—	—	59	RIAA: Gold
1992	The Art of Rebellion: Released: June 30, 1992; Label: Epic	52	—	—	—	84	—	35	40	—	
1993	Still Cyco After All These Years^{[B]}: Released: June 15, 1993; Label: Epic	117	—	—	112	—	—	68	—	—	
1994	Suicidal for Life: Released: June 14, 1994; Label: Epic	82	—	—	180	—	—	32	—	87	
1999	Freedumb: Released: May 18, 1999; Label: Suicidal/SideOneDummy	—	—	—	147	—	—	90	—	—	
2000	Free Your Soul and Save My Mind: Released: September 12, 2000; Label: Suicidal	—	—	—	—	—	—	92	—	—	
2010	No Mercy Fool!/The Suicidal Family^{[C]}: Released: September 7, 2010; Label: Suicidal	—	—	—	—	—	—	—	—	—	
2013	13: Released: March 26, 2013; Label: Suicidal	187	50	15	—	—	169	—	—	—	
2016	World Gone Mad: Released: September 30, 2016; Label: Suicidal	192	—	—	—	—	126	41	—	—	
2018	Still Cyco Punk After All These Years^{[D]}: Released: September 7, 2018; Label: Suicidal	—	—	—	—	—	—	94	—	—	
"—" denotes a release that did not chart.

Notes

- A. Controlled by Hatred/Feel Like Shit... Déjà Vu has been referred to as either an EP or a compilation album containing previously released or unreleased material, but is still considered a studio album.
- B. Still Cyco After All These Years is a re-recording of the self-titled debut album, also includes one unreleased track and re-recordings of 2 songs from Join the Army
- C. No Mercy Fool!/The Suicidal Family is a re-recording of songs from Join the Army and No Mercy: Widespread Bloodshed / Love Runs Red with 3 other songs.
- D. Still Cyco Punk After All These Years is a near-complete re-recording of frontman Mike "Cyco Miko" Muir's 1996 solo debut album Lost My Brain! (Once Again), also includes one unreleased track.

=== Compilation albums ===
Year	Album details
1992	F.N.G.: Released: June 29, 1992; Label: Virgin
1997	Prime Cuts: Released: June 3, 1997; Label: Epic
2010	Playlist: The Very Best of Suicidal Tendencies: Released: January 26, 2010; Label: Legacy
2013	コレクション (Collection): Released: September 3, 2013; Label: Valbergé Recordings

== Extended plays ==
Year	Album details
1998	Six the Hard Way: Released: November 17, 1998; Label: Suicidal
2018	Get Your Fight On!: Released: March 9, 2018; Label: Suicidal

== Singles ==
Year	Song	US		UK	Album
Year	Song	Rock	Alt	UK	Album
1987	"Possessed to Skate"	—	—	—	Join the Army
1988	"Institutionalized"	—	—	—	Suicidal Tendencies
1988	"Trip at the Brain"	—	—	—	How Will I Laugh Tomorrow When I Can't Even Smile Today
1988	"Surf and Slam"/"Pledge Your Allegiance"	—	—	—	How Will I Laugh Tomorrow When I Can't Even Smile Today
1989	"How Will I Laugh Tomorrow"	—	—	—	How Will I Laugh Tomorrow When I Can't Even Smile Today
1990	"Send Me Your Money"	—	—	83	Lights...Camera...Revolution!
1990	"You Can't Bring Me Down"	—	—	—	Lights...Camera...Revolution!
1990	"Lovely"	—	—	—	Lights...Camera...Revolution!
1991	"Alone"	—	—	—	Lights...Camera...Revolution!
1992	"Nobody Hears"	28	—	—	The Art of Rebellion
1992	"I Wasn't Meant to Feel This/Asleep at the Wheel"	—	21	—	The Art of Rebellion
1992	"Monopoly on Sorrow"	—	—	—	The Art of Rebellion
1993	"I'll Hate You Better"	34	—	—	The Art of Rebellion
1993	"I Saw Your Mommy"	—	—	—	Still Cyco After All These Years
1994	"I Wouldn't Mind"	—	—	—	Suicidal for Life
1994	"What You Need's a Friend"	—	—	—	Suicidal for Life
1994	"Love Vs. Loneliness"	—	—	—	Suicidal for Life
2016	"Clap Like Ozzy"	—	—	—	World Gone Mad
2017	"Living for Life"	—	—	—	World Gone Mad
2018	"Nothing to Lose"	—	—	—	Get Your Fight On!
2018	"F.U.B.A.R."	—	—	—	Still Cyco Punk After All These Years
2025	"Adrenaline Addict"	—	—	—	none
"—" denotes a release that did not chart.

== Videos ==
=== Video albums ===
Year	Album details
1990	Lights...Camera...Suicidal: Released: November 20, 1990; Label: Sony Music Video Enterprises
2010	Live at the Olympic Auditorium: Released: January 26, 2010; Label: Suicidal/Fontana

=== Music videos ===
Year	Title	Director
1984	"Institutionalized"	Bill Fishman
1987	"Possessed to Skate"	Bill Fishman
1988	"Trip at the Brain"	Bill Fishman
1989	"How Will I Laugh Tomorrow"	Paul Rachman
1989	"Waking the Dead"	Peter Lauer
1990	"How Will I Laugh Tomorrow" (Heavy Emotion Version)	Peter Lauer
1990	"War Inside My Head"	Paul Rachman
1990	"You Can't Bring Me Down"	Simeon Soffer
1991	"Alone"	
1991	"Send Me Your Money"	Sara Nichols
1992	"I Wasn't Meant to Feel This/Asleep at the Wheel"	Eric Matthews, Wing Ko
1992	"Nobody Hears"	Samuel Bayer
1993	"I'll Hate You Better"	
1993	"Institutionalized" (Version 2)	Bill Fishman
1994	"Love vs. Loneliness"	Sean Alatorre Actors:Thauro and Celeste
1998	"We Are Family"	
2000	"Pop Songs"	Glen Bennett
2008	"Come Alive"	Glen Bennett
2010	"I Feel Your Pain... and I Survive!"	Luke Sorensen
2012	"Possessed to Skate (Redux)"	Luke Sorensen
2012	"Cyco Style"	Pep Williams
2013	"Smash It!"	Jay Schweitzer
2014	"Slam City"	Luke Sorensen
2017	"Live for Life"	Pep Williams
