= Collection (Suicidal Tendencies album) =

コレクション (Collection)

Compilation album by Suicidal Tendencies
- Released: 3 September 2013
- Genre: Crossover thrash, thrash metal
- Length: 47:17
- Language: English
- Label: Valbergé Recordings

Suicidal Tendencies chronology
13 (2013)	コレクション (Collection) (2013)	World Gone Mad (2016)

コレクション (Collection) is a compilation album, which was released on the Valbergé Recordings. It featured a collection of Suicidal Tendencies recordings from their years at Epic Records. The CD-only release was packaged in a 3D folding Digipak.

Unusual for a best-of compilation album, コレクション (Collection) features only eight tracks totalling over 40 minutes in length. Like Prime Cuts and Playlist, one of Suicidal Tendencies' biggest hits, "I'll Hate You Better", is not included on this compilation album. It also omits some of their other radio hits, including "Trip at the Brain", "You Can't Bring Me Down", "Lovely", "Alone", "Monopoly on Sorrow" and "What You Need's a Friend".

Punknews.org rated the album three and a half stars.

== Track listing ==
No.	Title	Writer(s)	Length
1.	"How Will I Laugh Tomorrow" (from How Will I Laugh Tomorrow When I Can't Even Smile Today, 1988)	Mike Muir	6:44
2.	"Waking the Dead" (from Controlled by Hatred/Feel Like Shit...Déjà Vu, 1989)	Mike Clark, Muir	6:56
3.	"Send Me Your Money" (from Lights...Camera...Revolution!, 1990)	Muir	3:24
4.	"I Wasn't Meant to Feel This/Asleep at the Wheel" (from The Art of Rebellion, 1992)	Muir	7:07
5.	"War Inside My Head/I Want More (Live at The Ritz in New York, NY – September 8, 1990)" (from the "Send Me Your Money" 12")	Muir, Louiche Mayorga	5:47
6.	"I Saw Your Mommy" (from Still Cyco After All These Years, 1993)	Muir	4:50
7.	"Nobody Hears" (from The Art of Rebellion, 1992)	Muir, Rocky George	5:34
8.	"Love Vs. Loneliness" (from Suicidal for Life, 1994)	Muir, Clark, George	6:55
Total length:			47:17
