= Josh Paul (musician) =

American bassist (born 1977)

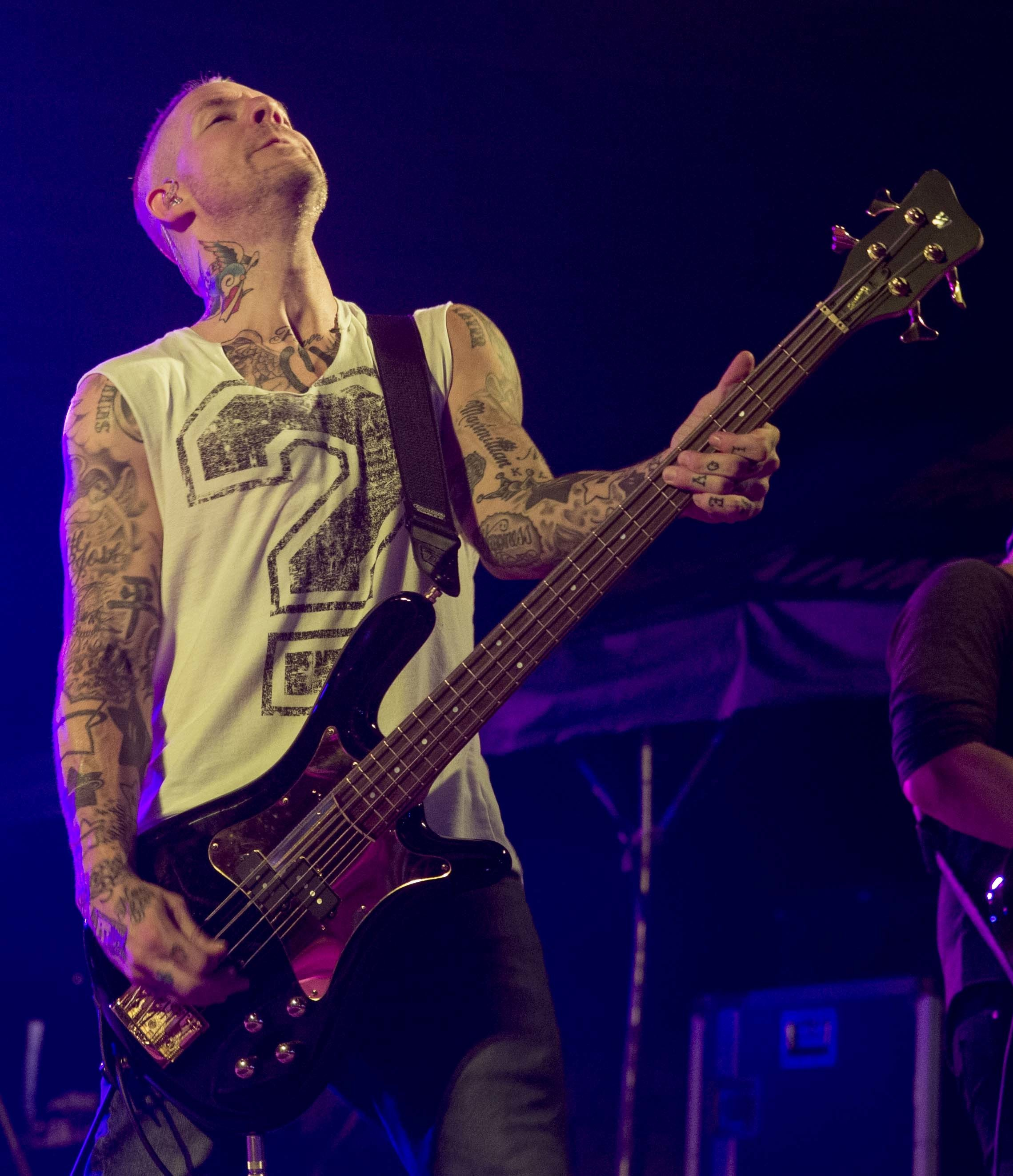
- Paul performing with Daughtry in 2014

Background information
- Born: June 13, 1977 (age 48)
- Origin: Los Angeles, California
- Genres: Funk rock; punk rock; soul; alternative rock; hard rock; post-grunge
- Occupation: Bassist
- Years active: 1996–present

Josh Paul (born June 13, 1977) is an American bass guitarist best known as an original member of the band Daughtry, playing on all six of their studio albums. In January 2022, Paul left Daughtry. Prior to that, at the age of 18, he joined thrash/punk band Suicidal Tendencies. Other notable work includes his soul/rock side project Bobby Church, and contributions to a diverse range of bands and artists such as Infectious Grooves, Everlast, Kelly Osbourne, The Veronicas, and Ashley Parker Angel.

== Early life ==
Paul started on drums around the age of four. His parents were both gospel musicians, and he drummed in his grandfather's Dixieland band. At seven years old he appeared playing drums in the music video for Don Henley's 1984 single "The Boys of Summer". He switched to playing bass around the age of 10 when his family moved.

"I loved playing drums... still love playing drums... but, we moved into an apartment, and landlords just don't like drums [laughs]"

He played in various bands around L.A. during this time and was active in the music scene. He mentions "...[hanging] out with the members of the band Fishbone a lot", and at only 15 had earned an endorsement for bass guitar. He was 17 or 18 when he got a call from a friend Brooks Wackerman to ask if he would play in Suicidal Tendencies.

== Musical career ==
=== Suicidal Tendencies and Infectious Grooves (1996–2002) ===
The chance to join Suicidal Tendencies was, according to Paul...

"...a dream come true, because I was to replace Robert Trujillo, who's one of my idols"

He joined at a time when the band was coming back from one of several breakups, and in the meantime many members had started or further pursued other projects (Trujillo had joined Ozzy Osbourne's band), leaving only Mike Muir (vocals) and Mike Clark (rhythm guitar). His friend Brooks was hired on as the new drummer, and the two were with the band until around 2002, when the band went through another change of lineup. During his time with Suicidal Tendencies, Paul played on the EP Six the Hard Way, the albums Freedumb and Free Your Soul and Save My Mind, and guest played track 3 of the album 13 (released in 2013). Trujillo remained in Muir's supergroup Infectious Grooves after having left Suicidal Tendencies, but Paul also recorded three tracks for their Mas Borracho album.

=== Transition period (2002–2006) ===
He left Suicidal Tendencies amicably in 2002 explaining...

“Punk had such a huge impact on where I was growing up, so being a part of that band was really a dream. [...] It was a hard decision to leave, but I wanted more time to focus on making my own music and producing other artists. Plus, I was looking for the challenge of playing different kinds of music with other bands.”

Between 2002 and when he joined Daughtry in 2006, he worked and toured with a wide variety of other projects including (in no particular order) Kelly Osbourne, Everlast, The Veronica’s, DJ Samantha Ronson, and Ashley Parker Angel as a bassist and/or musical director. He says of that time period...

"Every project pushed me in different directions and allowed me to grow musically, but they didn’t give me the creative outlet I really wanted."

=== Daughtry (2006–2012, 2013–2022) ===
Paul auditioned to play bass in Chris Daughtry's band and was hired in 2006. He says of joining Daughtry...

"... It’s a collaborative effort and we all have a voice in the music. This band really is something special.”

He has played on all of their releases to date, including five full albums, and the band's sixth album was released in 2021.

He briefly (amicably) left the band in 2012 but rejoined in 2013. Paul left the band again in January 2022 saying, "Now is the moment for change."

== Personal life ==
As of 2015, Paul lives in Nashville, Tennessee, and has four sons.

== Instruments ==
He plays and endorses Warwick bass guitars, EMG pickups, and GK amps and cabs.
