= World Gone Mad =

Studio album by Suicidal Tendencies
- Released: September 30, 2016
- Recorded: 2016
- Genres: Crossover thrash; thrash metal
- Length: 56:20
- Label: Suicidal Records
- Producers: Mike Muir; Paul Northfield

Suicidal Tendencies chronology
コレクション (Collection) (2013)	World Gone Mad (2016)	Get Your Fight On! (2018)

Singles from World Gone Mad
- 1. "Clap Like Ozzy" Released: August 5, 2016; 2. "Living For Life" Released: June 27, 2017

World Gone Mad is the thirteenth studio album by the American crossover thrash band Suicidal Tendencies, released on September 30, 2016. It is the band's first studio album (and the only album of original material) to feature Dave Lombardo on drums, Ra Díaz on bass, and Jeff Pogan on rhythm guitar. Vocalist Mike Muir had stated that World Gone Mad could have been Suicidal Tendencies' final studio album, although he later retracted that statement.

== Background ==
Suicidal Tendencies released their eleventh studio album, titled 13, in 2013, and it received mixed to positive reviews by critics. By the time of its release, it was rumored that 13 was the first of three albums that Suicidal Tendencies had finished in 2011. Guitarist Dean Pleasants commented, "13 was some of the stuff that Mike mentioned in that. But yeah, I think if there's something else that comes out in the future it will definitely be us writing again. But some of the songs, as time changes you change with how you feel and how you write, and sometimes Mike will take a song and totally change the lyrics of it and maybe the way the chorus or something is and it became what it is now. We've never had a problem with material; we've never had a shortage of material. Our biggest problem is what to put out, so it's like the opposite for us. I know some bands spend a lot of time working on four songs and we'll go in and crank out a bunch of tunes. Everybody always has so many ideas that, for us, it's a matter of finding the ones we think fit really good together."

In a December 2014 interview with Loudwire, vocalist Mike Muir was asked if Suicidal Tendencies were going to make a follow-up to 13. He replied, "Right now I have no answer to that as far as the previous one. There were a lot of things that went on and I think for us now, if everyone said they wanted to get into the studio and there was something they really wanted to do, I'd take it into consideration. But we're in the studio all the time, we're always recording." In an April 2015 interview with Metalhead Blog, guitarist Dean Pleasants revealed that Suicidal Tendencies had been working on new material for a possible compilation album.

In a February 2016 interview, Muir hinted at a new EP, followed by a new full-length studio album, inspired by the current political climate and upcoming election. He also stated that the new album and EP may be the band's final recordings, although he added, "I thought the first one would probably be the last we would do, too."

On February 20, 2016, the band announced that former Slayer drummer Dave Lombardo, a longtime friend of the band, would be playing drums on their February–March 2016 tour with Megadeth, and again on their May–June 2016 European tour. At first, it was unclear if Lombardo was only playing with Suicidal Tendencies as a fill-in drummer, but on May 15, 2016, the posted a video of him on Instagram laying down tracks for their follow-up to 13, which was due for release in September. This indicated that Lombardo is a full-time member of the band. Earlier that month, guitarist Nico Santora announced on his Facebook page that he had left Suicidal Tendencies to focus on his new project Lillake. He was replaced by Oneironaut guitarist Jeff Pogan.

On June 17, 2016, Suicidal Tendencies announced in a newsletter that they were in the final stages of mixing the album, and announced September 30 as the release date. Later that month, Mike Muir revealed that the album would be called The World Gone Mad, and that the band plans to release a new EP in January 2017. However, the title of the album was later changed to simply World Gone Mad.

On August 5, 2016, Suicidal Tendencies revealed the artwork and track listing for World Gone Mad, and announced that the album was available for pre-order on their official website, with a free download of its lead single "Clap Like Ozzy", making it the band's first official single since 1994's "Love Vs. Loneliness".

Asked in September 2016 if World Gone Mad would be Suicidal Tendencies' final studio album, Muir replied, "Right now, it probably will [be]. We recorded extra songs — well, we recorded quite a few songs — and so specifically when the inauguration comes out, when the next [U.S.] president is [sworn in], whoever that is, we'll have an EP that we're putting out that's a little... People say we're political, I don't say we're political, but this is a little more political — Suicidal politics. [We'll have] an EP [coming] out, I guess that's January 21st [of 2017]. But we have no plans [for other albums right now]. Of course, same thing with Dave. Dave's already talking about, 'When we do the next record...' And I'm, like, 'Hold on! Hold on!' [Laughs] He has such a youthful enthusiasm, it's great. But, you know, I think when you do something, you should… kind of the same approach like I said with the shows: this might be our last one, so it doesn't matter if you're sick and you're throwing up, you just have to forget about it and move on. And I think for a record, you have to take the approach, 'If this is my last record, am I gonna be happy?' I think that's a really important thing. And if it comes down and there's a situation that I really feel it's important that we do another Suicidal record, I would have to talk to my family, 'cause it takes a lot of time and commitment [to do] that."

The song "This World" previously appeared on the band's previous album 13.

== Reception ==
Professional ratings
Aggregate scores
Source	Rating
Metacritic	55/100
Review scores
Source	Rating
Metal Hammer	4/5 stars
Kerrang!	40/100
Record Collector	6/10
Punknews.org	3.5/5 stars
metal.de	8/10
Rock Hard	8/10

World Gone Mad has received generally positive reviews from critics. Nik Young of Metal Hammer praised the album and gave it a rating of four out five stars, saying: "It is almost unfair to deliver worthy albums and killer live shows for 30-plus years and then be joined by none other than Dave Lombardo for your new album. Long-timers Mike Muir and Dean Pleasants are successfully joined by two more new and talented members, too – bassist Ra Diaz and ex-guitar tech Jeff Pogan." He adds that World Gone Mad boasts a "pleasingly traditional Suicidal style, with instantly recognisable vocals, heavy punk attitude, a flair for both the rhythmic and the weird, and a delightful wish to enjoy themselves as they play."

Despite receiving positive reviews, World Gone Mad peaked at number 192 on the Billboard 200, the lowest chart position in Suicidal Tendencies' career. The album also peaked at number 41 in Germany, making it the band's third-highest position there behind The Art of Rebellion (1992) and Suicidal for Life (1994), which peaked at number 35 and 32 respectively.

== Track listing ==
All songs written by Mike Muir except where noted.

No.	Title	Length
1.	"Clap Like Ozzy"	4:24
2.	"The New Degeneration"	6:20
3.	"Living for Life"	4:50
4.	"Get Your Fight On!" (Dean Pleasants, Muir)	4:56
5.	"World Gone Mad"	3:57
6.	"Happy Never After"	6:04
7.	"One Finger Salute"	5:18
8.	"Damage Control"	5:14
9.	"The Struggle is Real"	2:48
10.	"Still Dying to Live"	7:38
11.	"This World"	4:51
Total length:		56:20

== Personnel ==
- Mike Muir – vocals
- Dean Pleasants – lead guitar
- Dave Lombardo – drums
- Ra Díaz – bass
- Jeff Pogan – rhythm guitar

== Charts ==
Chart (2016)	Peak position
Belgian Albums (Ultratop Flanders)	93
Belgian Albums (Ultratop Wallonia)	81
French Albums (SNEP)	126
German Albums (Offizielle Top 100)	41
US Billboard 200	192
