= Get Your Fight On! =

EP by Suicidal Tendencies
- Released: March 9, 2018
- Recorded: 2016–2017
- Length: 45:12
- Label: Suicidal Records
- Producer: Paul Northfield

Suicidal Tendencies chronology
World Gone Mad (2016)	Get Your Fight On! (2018)	Still Cyco Punk After All These Years (2018)

Singles from Get Your Fight On!
- 1. "Nothing to Lose" Released: January 19, 2018

Professional ratings
Review scores
Source	Rating
Punknews.org	3.5/5 stars

Get Your Fight On! is the second EP by the American crossover thrash band Suicidal Tendencies, which was released on March 9, 2018.

The EP, which preceded the band's then-upcoming thirteenth studio album Still Cyco Punk After All These Years by six months, is their first since 1998's Six the Hard Way, while its release marks a lineup of Suicidal Tendencies only the second in the band's history to record more than one record together. However, guitarist Jeff Pogan would leave the band shortly after its release.

In addition to four new songs (including a cover of the Stooges' "I Got a Right"), the EP contains re-recordings of "Nothing to Lose" and "Ain't Mess'n Around" – both taken from Cyco Miko's 1996 solo album Lost My Brain! (Once Again) – and four variations of "Get Your Fight On!", including the album version which can be found on World Gone Mad.

== Track listing ==
No.	Title	Notes	Length
1.	"Nothing to Lose"	Re-recording of Cyco Miko song	3:01
2.	"Get United"		4:04
3.	"iAuthority"		4:26
4.	"Ain't Mess'n Around"	Re-recording of Cyco Miko song	5:50
5.	"S.E.D."		4:41
6.	"I Got a Right"	The Stooges cover	3:39
7.	"Get Your Right On!"	Acoustic version	4:56
8.	"Get Your Bass On!"	Bass instrumental	4:57
9.	"Get Your Shred On!"	Guitar instrumental	4:43
10.	"Get Your Fight On!"	LP version	4:55
Total length:			45:12

== Personnel ==
- Mike Muir – lead vocals
- Dean Pleasants – lead guitar
- Jeff Pogan – rhythm guitar
- Ra Díaz – bass
- Dave Lombardo – drums
