= Prime Cuts (Suicidal Tendencies album) =

Greatest hits album by Suicidal Tendencies
- Released: June 3, 1997
- Genre: Skate punk Crossover thrash
- Length: 1:06:22
- Label: Epic

Suicidal Tendencies chronology
Suicidal for Life (1994)	Prime Cuts (1997)	Friends & Family, Vol. 1 (1997)

Professional ratings
Review scores
Source	Rating
AllMusic	4.5/5 stars
Collector's Guide to Heavy Metal	7/10

Prime Cuts is a compilation released by American crossover thrash band Suicidal Tendencies. It was released in 1997 on Epic Records.

== Background ==
Prime Cuts contains songs from each of Suicidal Tendencies' major label albums from How Will I Laugh Tomorrow When I Can't Even Smile Today through Suicidal for Life (except for their 1989 album Controlled by Hatred/Feel Like Shit...Déjà Vu), as well as two brand new tracks, "Berserk!" and "Feeding the Addiction", and two reworked tracks from their 1987 album Join the Army, "Join the New Army" and "Go Skate! (Possessed To Skate '97)". Prime Cuts also includes the re-recorded versions of "Institutionalized" and "I Saw Your Mommy" from the band's 1993 album Still Cyco After All These Years.

== Track listing ==
No.	Title	Writer(s)	Length
1.	"You Can't Bring Me Down"		5:50
2.	"Join the New Army"		4:04
3.	"Lovely"		3:45
4.	"Institutionalized"		3:30
5.	"Gotta Kill Captain Stupid"		4:02
6.	"Berserk!"	Mike Muir, Brooks Wackerman, Dean Pleasants	2:43
7.	"I Saw Your Mommy"		4:51
8.	"Pledge Your Allegiance"		4:32
9.	"Feeding the Addiction"	Muir, Mike Clark	4:16
10.	"I Wasn't Meant to Feel This / Asleep at the Wheel"		7:07
11.	"Send Me Your Money"		3:24
12.	"No Fuck'n Problem"		3:31
13.	"Go Skate! (Possessed to Skate '97)"		2:43
14.	"Nobody Hears"		5:34
15.	"How Will I Laugh Tomorrow"		6:44
