= Suicidal tendencies =

Suicidal tendencies is the propensity for a person to have suicidal ideation or to make suicide attempts. It may also refer to:

== Entertainment ==
- Suicidal Tendencies, a band that was founded in Venice, Los Angeles, California, in 1981 by the leader and only permanent member, singer Mike Muir
  - Suicidal Tendencies (album), Suicidal Tendencies' debut studio album
- "Suicidal Tendencies" (Arrow), an episode of Arrow

== Psychosociology ==
- Suicide, the act of a human being intentionally causing their own death
- Suicidal person, a person who is experiencing a suicide crisis, and is contemplating, attempting or seeking a means to commit suicide
- Suicide crisis, a situation in which a person is attempting to kill him or herself or is seriously contemplating or planning to do so
- Suicidal ideation, a common medical term for thoughts about suicide, which may be as detailed as a formulated plan, without the suicidal act itself
- Parasuicide, refers to suicide attempts or gestures and self-harm where there is no actual intention to die, indicator for a successful future suicide
- Suicide attempt, an act in which an individual tries to kill themselves but survives

== See also ==
- Category:Suicide
