= Nobody Hears =

Single by Suicidal Tendencies

from the album The Art of Rebellion
- Released: 1992
- Genre: Alternative metal; alternative rock
- Length: 5:34
- Label: Epic
- Songwriters: Mike Muir; Rocky George
- Producer: Peter Collins

Suicidal Tendencies singles chronology
"Lovely" (1991)	"Nobody Hears" (1992)	"Asleep at the Wheel" (1992)

"Nobody Hears" is a song recorded by crossover thrash band Suicidal Tendencies. It was released as the first single from the band's 1992 album The Art of Rebellion, and became their biggest U.S. hit at the time, peaking at number 28 on the Billboard Mainstream Rock chart.

== Music video ==
The video for "Nobody Hears" was aired in December 1992, and directed by Samuel Bayer, who had recently directed the video for Nirvana's "Smells Like Teen Spirit". The video is almost entirely in black and white and features the band performing the song.
