= 13 (Suicidal Tendencies album) =

Studio album by Suicidal Tendencies
- Released: March 26, 2013
- Recorded: 2002–2012
- Studio: ST Studio; Interscope Studios; Stall #2; Titan Studio
- Genre: Crossover thrash; thrash metal
- Length: 58:13
- Label: Suicidal Records

Suicidal Tendencies chronology
| No Mercy Fool!/The Suicidal Family (2010) | 13 (2013) | コレクション (Collection) (2013) |

13 is the twelfth studio album by the American crossover thrash band Suicidal Tendencies. It was released on March 26, 2013. The album was recorded over a ten-year period at the band's studio "ST Studio", while additional recording took place at Interscope Studios, Stall #2 and Titan Studio.

13 is Suicidal Tendencies' first album containing original material since 2000's Free Your Soul and Save My Mind, although they had re-recorded their older material and released a handful of new songs on Friends & Family, Vol. 2 (2001), Year of the Cycos (2008) and No Mercy Fool!/The Suicidal Family (2010). 13 is also the band's only studio album with guitarist Nico Santora, bassist Stephen Bruner and drummer Eric Moore, and features five of Suicidal Tendencies' former members (Mike Clark, Ron Bruner, Dave Hildago, Josh Paul, and Tim "Rawbiz" Williams), who are credited as "additional musicians".

== Background and recording ==
Since at least 2002, there had been speculation of a Suicidal Tendencies album featuring all-new original material. Further, there were extensive reports that many tracks had been recorded with longtime producer Paul Northfield, known for his work with progressive metal bands like Dream Theater, Queensrÿche and Rush. On September 11, 2002, Muir posted a message on the band's official website, stating that they would be in the studio "working on new ST songs", although he said the band was already in the studio before their European tour and were "really happy with the results". He also mentioned that the band would "record some new songs" before he would "go leave town on a business trip" and was hoping for an early 2003 release. In January 2003, it was reported that Suicidal Tendencies were set to enter the studio later in the month to begin work on the album. The band explained, "We've got a number of meetings and people coming from all over. We'll leave it at that for now. However, by the end of the month we should have a good idea as to how we plan on proceeding, and what we hope to accomplish musically and individually in the coming year. When decisions are made, we'll let you know." On October 10, 2003, Suicidal Tendencies mentioned on their official website that the band would be releasing "at least one, and possible two ST CDs" in 2004.

On October 21, 2004, Suicidal Tendencies announced on their official website that they were still working on the new album and stated that this had "been a major highlight, proud spot and focal point for the band in terms of creativity and ability to move forward with its various musical and visual projects." The band also stated that they were working producer Paul Northfield on both the Suicidal album and new Infectious Grooves album. Later that month, the band issued the following statement in an effort to clear up possible misunderstandings with regards to their new project Return to Venice and the Suicidal Tendencies album. The band explained, "Return to Venice will be released before the real new Suicidal Tendencies album." Because of Mike Muir's back status, the band decided to release the compilation first. Obviously this album will have different artwork than the "new-cover-photo-idea", which has just been sent out to the guy who's gonna finalize the cover concept. Also, Return to Venice will feature a compilation of bands attached to Suicidal Records and/or Venice and will contain no re-recordings of the classic 1985 Welcome to Venice."

On January 16, 2006, Muir posted an update on the band's official website that Suicidal Tendencies had returned to the studio again to begin work on the album, stating that Northfield had "flown back into town" and work had "started on the new Suicidal Tendencies CD". He also stated that the band would be "sorting, working on and finishing up all the projects" that the band hoped "to release in the next year...of course starting with the new Suicidal Tendencies CD" and wouldn't "be rushing back to do any shows or making any touring plans 'till after" the album would be completed.

On March 3, 2006, Suicidal Tendencies posted the following update on the new album on their official website:

The new stuff is sounding great. We're real excited at how it's all come together. Paul Northfield flew home and we're gonna live with the tracks for awhile, and he'll be back next month to make any changes and do the final mixes. We've been getting a lot of emails about the title of the record. We have a couple ideas for title and artwork, but we're gonna wait till the music is all done and deal with it then.

Asked in February 2008 when the new album was expected to be released, Muir replied:

Suicidal goes to Argentina next week and does a couple of festivals, so we do that then Infectious comes to Australia and does the Soundwave festival, then in April we do a month in Europe, then June and July we do another month and a half with Infectious Grooves, then about September the next Suicidal comes out then before that we put out a CD that is basically a compilation of all the stuff that's gonna be coming out.

In February 2010, Mike Muir had noted that the new Suicidal Tendencies album would be released in late 2010, although this release date had already passed and at the band's performance at the FunFunFun Fest lineup at Waterloo Park in Austin, TX on November 7, 2010, he informed the crowd that a new album would be released in 2011. However, in May 2011, Muir told KillYourStereo.com that the new album would likely be released in 2012 as he was working on a Cyco Miko album in October, which would have a "taste of new Suicidal, old unreleased Suicidal, new Infectious Grooves, old Infectious Grooves and a bunch of other stuff as well."

In November 2011, Mike Muir stated that Suicidal Tendencies had completed three new albums and they were "just putting them together in a time frame."

On May 31, 2012, rhythm guitarist Mike Clark received a head injury during an incident at their May 31 concert in Santa Cruz, resulting in a concussion that also required nine staples to a gash on his head. Clark was replaced by Nico Santora.

On December 5, 2012, Muir told Australia's Tone Deaf that Suicidal Tendencies were tracking drums at Dr. Dre's exclusive Interscope Studio, and recording "hundreds and hundreds of tracks" that they like.

On February 21, 2013, it was reported that Suicidal Tendencies would release their new album, now called 13, on March 26.

== Title ==
The album's title has various meanings. The album's title is a reference to the fact that it contains 13 songs, and that it is Suicidal Tendencies' first full-length in 13 years. Also, 13 is Suicidal Tendencies' 13th studio release (counting Controlled by Hatred/Feel Like Shit...Déjà Vu, Still Cyco After All These Years, Six the Hard Way and No Mercy Fool!/The Suicidal Family) and was released in 2013, the 13th year of the 21st century. It shares the same title as Black Sabbath's 13, which was released three months later, and Megadeth's TH1RT3EN, which was released in 2011. The title is also similar to Anvil's 2007 album This Is Thirteen. The number is also a reference to the alleged gang affiliation of the band, as "13" is heavily used in California Mexican-American Sureño gang culture.

== Reception ==
Professional ratings
Review scores
| Source | Rating |
|---|---|
| AllMusic | 3.5/5 stars |

Fred Thomas of AllMusic rated the album three-and-a-half stars out of five, and states, "Thirty years after their debut, they return with 13, their first album of new material in 13 years and coincidentally their 13th album. Produced by Suicidal frontman Mike Muir, the album includes 13 tracks of the type of petulant, cathartic, thrashy hardcore the band is known for and includes cameos by Larry Linkogle and Jimmy Fitzpatrick of Metal Mulisha as well as a gang of professional skaters adding their voices to the track "Show Some Love... Tear It Down.""

13 was Suicidal Tendencies' first album since 1994's Suicidal for Life to enter the Billboard 200; however, the album debuted at #187, making it Suicidal Tendencies' lowest chart position at the time.

== Track listing ==
| No. | Title | Writer(s) | Length |
|---|---|---|---|
| 1. | "Shake It Out" | Mike Muir, Mike Clark | 3:50 |
| 2. | "Smash It!" | Muir, Santora | 3:46 |
| 3. | "This Ain't a Celebration" | Muir | 3:31 |
| 4. | "God Only Knows Who I Am" | Muir, Clark | 5:28 |
| 5. | "Make Your Stand" | Muir | 5:54 |
| 6. | "Who's Afraid?" | Muir, Clark | 4:07 |
| 7. | "Show Some Love... Tear It Down" | Muir | 3:31 |
| 8. | "Cyco Style" | Muir, Clark | 4:43 |
| 9. | "Slam City" | Muir, Dean Pleasants, Santora | 4:40 |
| 10. | "Till My Last Breath" | Muir, Pleasants | 4:39 |
| 11. | "Living the Fight" | Muir | 4:22 |
| 12. | "Life... (Can't Live with It, Can't Live Without It)" | Muir | 4:35 |
| 13. | "This World" | Muir | 5:07 |
| Total length: | | | 58:13 |

== Personnel ==
- Mike Muir – lead vocals
- Dean Pleasants – lead guitar
- Nico Santora – rhythm guitar
- Stephen "Thundercat" Bruner – bass
- Eric Moore – drums

=== Additional personnel ===
- Mike Clark – rhythm guitar (1, 4, 6, 8)
- Ronald Bruner Jr. – drums (4, 10, 12)
- Dave Hidalgo – drums (1)
- Josh Paul – bass (3)
- Adam Siegel – guitar (12)
- Tim "RAWBIZ" Williams – bass (2, 12)
- "Cyco Skate Choir"; Danny Way, Tony Trujillo, Steve Olson, Alex Olson, Jim "Red Dog" Muir, Elijah Berle & Vincent Alvarez – backing vocals (7)
- "Metal Mulisha"; Larry Linkogle & Jimmy Fitzpatrick – backing vocals (2)
