= Ra Diaz =

Chilean bassist

Ra Díaz
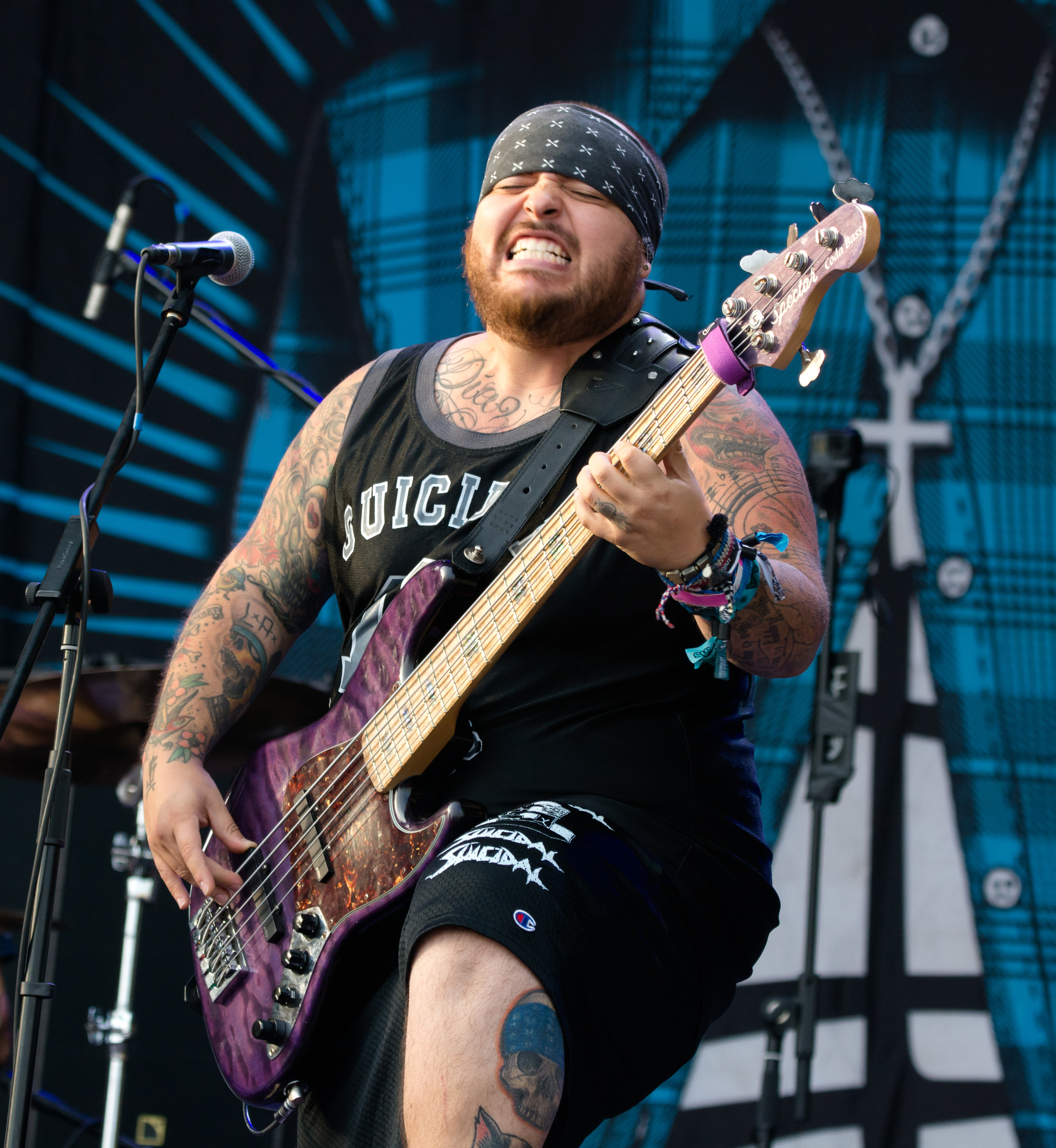
- Díaz in 2018

Background information
- Born: Roberto Díaz; March 15, 1984 (age 42); Viña del Mar, Chile
- Genres: Nu metal; crossover thrash; hardcore punk; funk metal
- Occupation: Bassist
- Instrument: Bass guitar
- Years active: 2001–present
- Member of: Korn
- Formerly of: Suicidal Tendencies; Tiro de Gracia; Drogatones; Ribo

Roberto "Ra" Díaz (born March 15, 1984) is a Chilean bassist. He is best known as the bassist for the American nu metal band Korn and as a former member of the crossover thrash band Suicidal Tendencies. Prior to his work in the United States, Díaz performed with Chilean acts including Ribo, Drogatones, and Tiro de Gracia. In October 2025, he was given the honorary title Hijo ilustre (Note: A title similar to the key to the city honor given in other countries.) of his hometown, Viña del Mar.

== Early life and musical education ==
Díaz was born in Viña del Mar, Chile, on March 15, 1984. He grew up in an extended family household where music was a regular presence. He developed an interest in music after his brother received an electric guitar. After initially practicing on a children's toy drum kit, he picked up the electric bass at age 12.

During his formative years, he was heavily influenced by funk rock, punk, and alternative metal acts with prominent basslines, such as Red Hot Chili Peppers, Infectious Grooves, Fishbone, Funkadelic, Primus, and Suicidal Tendencies. He formalized his musical education at the Projazz Music Academy in Santiago.

== Musical career ==
=== Chilean scene and move abroad (2001–2015) ===
Díaz began his career in 2001 by co-founding the Chilean alternative metal band Ribo, playing on their debut album Equilibrio (2003). In 2005, he joined the alternative rock group Drogatones, serving as their bassist between 2005 and 2009. In parallel with Drogatones, Díaz worked as a session and touring musician across several acts of the Chilean scene.

In late 2005, he co-founded the pop rock band Divina, fronted by Constanza Lüer (singer of Supernova), alongside former members of Dogma and Los Mox!, performing on their debut album Jugar con fuego (2007), released via EMI. During the same period, he toured as a live bassist for the hip hop group Tiro de Gracia, and played live with funk rock group Funk Attack, pop punk act Tronic, and others. In 2008, Díaz tracked bass for Eternidad, the debut solo album of former Kudai vocalist Nicole Natalino, and appeared in the promotional music video for the single "Seré".

Seeking to broaden his musical opportunities, he relocated to Mexico City in 2010 to work as a session bassist, joining the live band of Mexican rapper Niña Dioz and working with Ritmo Machine, a project led by DJ Bitman and Cypress Hill percussionist Eric Bobo. In 2013, he moved to Los Angeles, California. To establish himself within the Southern California music circuit, Díaz played in African-American gospel church services, participated in weekly jam sessions, and worked as an independent live and session musician.

=== Suicidal Tendencies (2016–2021) ===
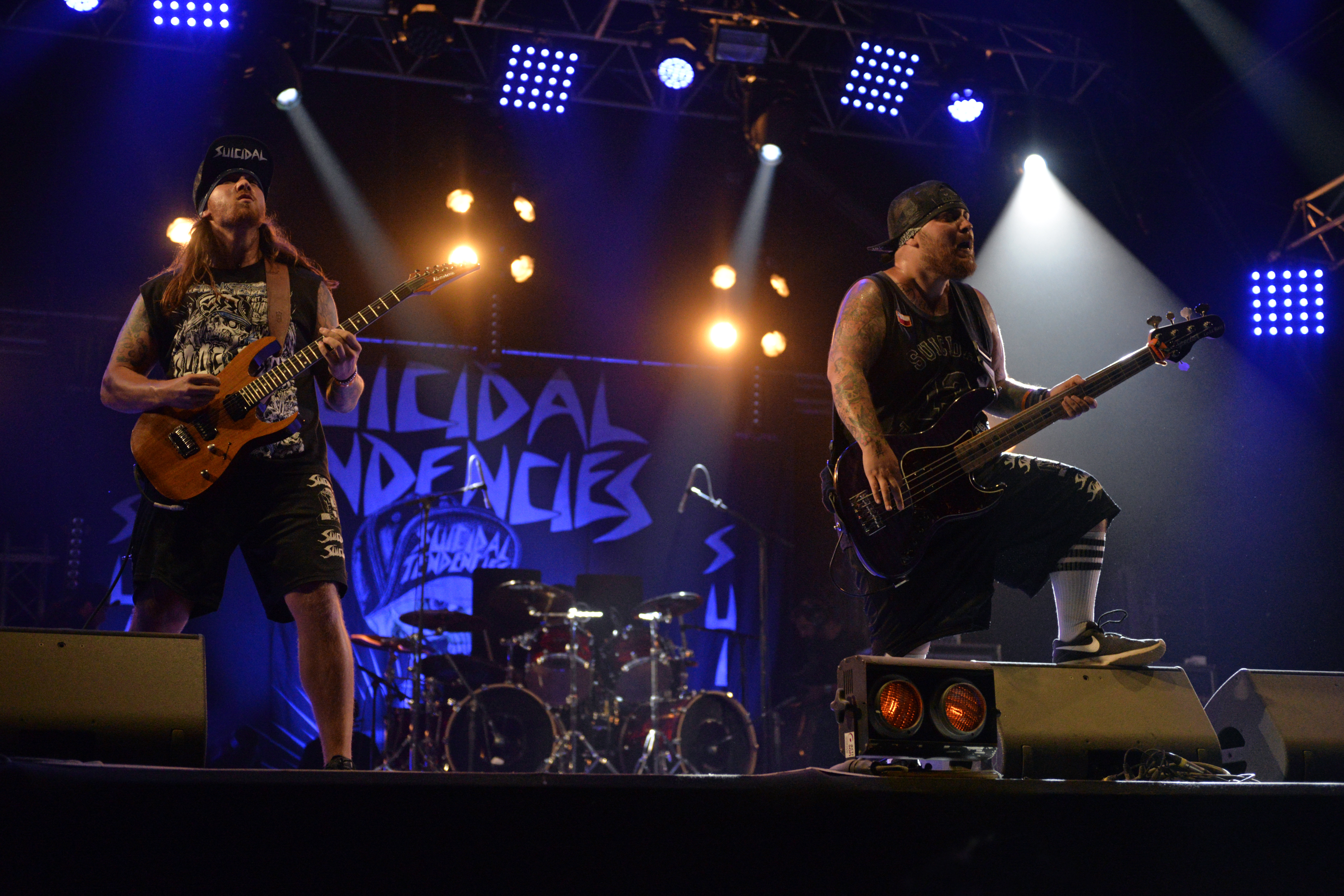
Díaz performing with Suicidal Tendencies in 2017

Díaz first established contact with Suicidal Tendencies in 2007 when the band performed in Chile for the first time. Over the following years, he stayed in touch with vocalist and bandleader Mike Muir whenever the group returned to the country. After moving to California, Díaz regularly posted videos on Instagram playing covers of Suicidal Tendencies and Muir's side project Infectious Grooves, which drew notice from the band's official accounts.

In early 2016, following the departure of bassist Michael Morgan, Muir recruited Díaz as the official bassist for Suicidal Tendencies. His studio recording debut with the group came on their twelfth studio album, World Gone Mad, released in September 2016. He subsequently recorded the EP Get Your Fight On! (2018) and the band's thirteenth studio album, Still Cyco Punk After All These Years (2018).

=== Korn (2021–present) ===
In June 2021, founding Korn bassist Reginald "Fieldy" Arvizu announced an indefinite hiatus from touring due to personal issues. Korn drummer Ray Luzier had previously followed Díaz on social media after watching a collaborative performance video featuring Díaz and former Fever 333 drummer Aric Improta. Luzier contacted Díaz via Instagram to arrange an audition as a temporary touring replacement. Following rehearsals, on July 12, 2021, Korn officially announced that Díaz would take over bass duties for their upcoming summer U.S. tour. His first live show with the band took place on July 16, 2021, at the Upheaval Festival in Grand Rapids, Michigan.

Because Korn's touring schedule continued to expand throughout 2021 and 2022 while Suicidal Tendencies remained on hold due to Muir undergoing back surgery, Díaz became Korn's permanent live bassist. In turn, Suicidal Tendencies enlisted Tye Trujillo to succeed him on bass.

Díaz recorded his first live effort with Korn on February 3, 2022, during a special album release event held at the Hollywood United Methodist Church in Los Angeles. The live set was officially mixed and released as the live album and EP Requiem Mass through Loma Vista Recordings on February 3, 2023.

In April 2026, Korn released the single "Reward the Scars", recorded for the Blizzard Entertainment video game expansion Diablo IV: Lord of Hatred, featuring Díaz on bass. In mid-April of that same year, a storage unit belonging to Díaz in Henderson, Nevada, was burglarized, resulting in the theft of 15 custom and vintage touring bass guitars, including a custom five-string model finished with the Chilean national flag intended for Korn's May 2026 Latin American tour. Two weeks later, the Henderson Police Department successfully recovered all of the stolen instruments undamaged after a tip from a local tattoo artist and musician, who recognized a bass bearing the custom "Ra ST" 12th-fret inlay (referencing his time in Suicidal Tendencies) at a local music store.

=== Collaborations ===
Throughout his career in the United States, Díaz has frequently recorded as a guest session musician on various punk, rock, and heavy metal projects. In 2018, he tracked bass for Biohazard guitarist Billy Graziadei's solo project BillyBio on the studio album Feed the Fire, later returning to perform on the 2022 follow-up Leaders and Liars.

During the COVID-19 pandemic lockdowns in 2020 and 2021, Díaz participated in a virtual cover project organized by Anthrax drummer Charlie Benante. These studio performances were later compiled on Benante's 2021 full-length release Silver Linings and the 2022 Record Store Day EP Moving Pitchers, featuring Díaz on covers of Massive Attack, Billie Eilish, Tom Petty, Run-DMC, and Rush. In 2023 and 2025, he played as a guest bassist on albums by Venamoris, the duo project of Paula Lombardo and Dave Lombardo.

== Honors and awards ==
On October 29, 2025, the Municipal Council and Mayor of Viña del Mar, Macarena Ripamonti, officially presented Díaz with the title of Hijo Ilustre (Illustrious Son) of the city. The distinction recognized his international musical career and his continued public representation of his Viña del Mar roots while performing and touring abroad.

== Discography ==
=== With Suicidal Tendencies ===
- World Gone Mad (2016)
- Get Your Fight On! (EP, 2018)
- Still Cyco Punk After All These Years (2018)

=== With Korn ===
- Requiem Mass (Live album / EP, 2023)
- "Reward the Scars" (Single, 2026)

=== With BillyBio ===
- Feed the Fire (2018)
- Leaders and Liars (2022)

=== With Charlie Benante ===
- Silver Linings (2021)
- Moving Pitchers (EP, 2022)

=== Other appearances and collaborations ===
- Divina – Jugar con fuego (2007)
- Nicole Natalino – Eternidad (2008)
- Maite Perroni – Eclipse de luna (2013; track "Inexplicable")
- Koke Benavides – Overload (2015; track "Onírico")
- Venamoris – Drown in Emotion (2023)
- Cardiac – Hijos del sol (2023)
- Venamoris – To Cross or to Burn (2025)
