= Still Cyco Punk After All These Years =

Studio album of re-recorded songs by Suicidal Tendencies
- Released: September 7, 2018
- Recorded: 2017–2018
- Genres: Punk rock; hardcore punk
- Length: 41:22
- Label: Suicidal
- Producers: Paul Northfield; Mike Muir

Suicidal Tendencies chronology
Get Your Fight On! (2018)	Still Cyco Punk After All These Years (2018)

Singles from Still Cyco Punk After All These Years
- 1. "F.U.B.A.R." Released: August 3, 2018

Professional ratings
Review scores
Source	Rating
Exclaim!	6/10

Still Cyco Punk After All These Years is the fourteenth studio album by the American crossover thrash band Suicidal Tendencies, released on September 7, 2018. This features re-recorded songs of Cyco Miko's 1996 debut album, Lost My Brain! (Once Again); it is a near-complete re-recording, since the only tracks from the original album not included are its last two tracks "Cyco Miko Wants You" and "Ain't Mess'n Around" (the latter, however, can be found on the Get Your Fight On! EP along with "Nothin' to Lose"), while "Sippin' from the Insanitea" was previously never released. The latter uses the same basic musical structure as "Cyco Miko Wants You", but with brand new lyrics and a different vocal melody.

The album's title is a play on Suicidal Tendencies' 1993 album Still Cyco After All These Years, which is also a collection of re-recorded and unreleased material. Still Cyco Punk After All These Years is also the last Suicidal Tendencies album with rhythm guitarist Jeff Pogan, who left the band two months prior to its release. It is also the last to feature drummer Dave Lombardo and bassist Ra Díaz. First presses included a CD version, black vinyl and limited edition colours in blue, lime green, purple, and gold.

== Track listing ==
All tracks are written by Mike Muir.

No.	Title	Length
1.	"I Love Destruction"	2:57
2.	"F.U.B.A.R."	2:37
3.	"All Kinda Crazy"	4:41
4.	"Sippin' from the Insanitea"	4:09
5.	"It's Always Something"	3:22
6.	"Lost My Brain…Once Again"	3:54
7.	"Nothin' to Lose"	3:04
8.	"Gonna Be Alright"	4:18
9.	"Ain't Gonna Get Me"	3:20
10.	"All I Ever Get"	3:02
11.	"Save a Peace for Me"	5:58
Total length:		41:22

== Personnel ==
- Mike Muir – vocals
- Dean Pleasants – lead guitar
- Jeff Pogan – rhythm guitar
- Ra Díaz – bass
- Dave Lombardo – drums

== Charts ==
Chart (2018)	Peak position
German Albums (Offizielle Top 100)	94
