= Free Your Soul and Save My Mind =

Free Your Soul...and Save My Mind

Studio album by Suicidal Tendencies
- Released: September 15, 2000
- Recorded: Titan Studios; Stall #2, Redondo Beach, California, U.S.
- Genre: Hardcore punk
- Length: 56:26
- Label: Suicidal Records
- Producer: Suicidal Tendencies

Suicidal Tendencies chronology
Freedumb (1999)	Free Your Soul...and Save My Mind (2000)	Friends & Family, Vol. 2 (2001)

Free Your Soul...and Save My Mind is the tenth studio album by crossover thrash band Suicidal Tendencies, released in 2000.

A music video was made for "Pop Songs". It was the band's first official video in six years, since "Love Vs. Loneliness" (from Suicidal for Life).

This album marked the only time Suicidal Tendencies did not make any personnel changes over three consecutive studio recordings, as the lineup of Mike Muir, Mike Clark, Dean Pleasants, Josh Paul and Brooks Wackerman had recorded their previous album Freedumb and their 1998 EP Six the Hard Way. Paul and Wackerman did, however, leave the band after the 2001 release of their split album Friends & Family, Vol. 2.

== Reception ==
Professional ratings
Review scores
Source	Rating
AllMusic	link

== Track listing ==
- All tracks written by Mike Muir and Mike Clark, unless stated

No.	Title	Writer(s)	Length
1.	"Self Destruct"		3:33
2.	"Su casa es mi casa"		4:09
3.	"No More No Less"		3:26
4.	"Free Your Soul... and Save My Mind"		3:52
5.	"Pop Songs"	Muir	2:19
6.	"Bullenium"		2:50
7.	"Animal"	Muir	2:11
8.	"Straight from the Heart"		4:43
9.	"Cyco Speak"	Muir	3:04
10.	"Start Your Brain"	Muir	3:16
11.	"Public Dissension"		3:26
12.	"Children of the Bored"		3:43
13.	"Got Mutation"		3:04
14.	"Charlie Monroe"		5:20
15.	"Home"	Muir, Dean Pleasants	7:31

== Credits ==
- Mike Muir – vocals
- Mike Clark – guitar
- Dean Pleasants – guitar
- Josh Paul – bass
- Brooks Wackerman – drums
- Herman Jackson – Moog bass on "Got Mutation"
- Produced by Suicidal Tendencies
- Recorded at Titan Studios, except tracks 5 and 7, recorded at Stall #2
- Engineered by Michael Vail Blum, except tracks 5 and 7, engineered by Darien Rundall
- Mixed by Paul Northfield at Skip Saylor, except tracks 5, 7, 9, and 10 mixed by Mike Blum and Suicidal Tendencies
- Mastered by Brian Gardner at Bernie Grundman Mastering Studios
- Artwork by Adam Siegel
