= Friends & Family, Vol. 1 =

Compilation album by Various Artists
- Released: 1997
- Recorded: 1997
- Genre: Thrash metal Post-punk; Funk metal
- Length: 61:13
- Label: Suicidal Records
- Producer: Suicidal Tendencies; The Freakazoid Twins; Michael Vail Blum

Various Artists chronology
Prime Cuts (1997)	Friends & Family, Vol. 1 (1997)	Six the Hard Way (1998)

Friends & Family, Vol. 1 is an album containing various artists' material including Suicidal Tendencies and Infectious Grooves. It was released by Suicidal Records in 1997.

It was sub-titled "Epic Escape" because Suicidal Tendencies – whose singer Mike Muir runs Suicidal Records – had exited the Epic Records label on which they had released much of their late 1980s and early 1990s material.

The Suicidal Tendencies tracks, "Scream Out" and "We Are Family", were eventually re-recorded and ended up on their next album, Freedumb in 1999.

The Cyco Miko track, "Big Fat Baby", was a re-recording of a track called "Lost My Brain (Once Again)" on the 1995 album of the same name.

== Track listing ==
No.	Title	Writer(s)	Artist	Length
1.	"Panic"	Mike Muir, Josh Paul	Suicidal Tendencies	4:30
2.	"Scream Out"	Muir	Suicidal Tendencies	2:29
3.	"We Are Family"	Muir, Mike Clark	Suicidal Tendencies	2:54
4.	"Epic Escape"	Muir, Dean Pleasants	Infectious Grooves	4:06
5.	"Payback's a Bitch"	Muir, Pleasants, Robert Trujillo	Infectious Grooves	5:42
6.	"It's Time"	Muir, Pleasants	Infectious Grooves	4:02
7.	"Sweet Disharmony"	Muir	Cyco Miko	6:12
8.	"Big Fat Baby"	Muir	Cyco Miko	4:08
9.	"Some People (Deserve to Die)"	Dosage, Fiendly	The Funeral Party	3:39
10.	"Teachin' Lil' Ricky a Lesson"	Dosage	The Funeral Party	5:44
11.	"Day at the Beach"	Mike "Milkbone" Jensen	Creeper	3:28
12.	"Dysfunktional"	Jensen, Clark	Creeper	3:34
13.	"Whose Got a Secret?"	The Freakazoid Twins	Musical Heroin	5:56
14.	"They Say"	The Freakazoid Twins	Musical Heroin	4:49

== Credits ==
=== Suicidal Tendencies and Infectious Grooves ===
- Mike Muir – vocals
- Mike Clark – guitar
- Dean Pleasants – guitar
- Josh Paul – bass
- Brooks Wackerman – drums

=== Cyco Miko ===
- Mike Muir – vocals
- Adam Siegel – guitar
- Dave Kushner – guitar
- Dave Silva – bass
- Greg Saenz – drums

=== The Funeral Party ===
- Claudia Ashton – vocals
- Fiendly – guitar and keyboards
- Dosage – guitar
- Splinters – bass
- Sam Pokeybo – drums

=== Creeper ===
- Mike "Milkbone" Jensen – vocals
- Mike Clark – guitar
- Michael Alvarado – drums
- @&*% – bass

=== Musical Heroin ===
- The Freakazoid Twins
  - Freaky Deaky – all instruments
  - Deaky Freaky – all instruments

=== All tracks ===
- Recorded at Titan Studios
- Tracks 1 – 6 produced by Suicidal Tendencies
- Tracks 9, 10, 13, and 14 produced by The Freakazoid Twins
- All songs engineered and additional production by Michael Vail Blum
- Executive produced by Albert Rouillard
- Tracks 1 – 5 mixed by Paul Northfield
- All other songs are rough mixes
- Mastered by Brian Gardner at Bernie Grundman Mastering
