= Institutionalized (song) =

Single by Suicidal Tendencies

from the album Suicidal Tendencies
- Released: 1988
- Recorded: 1983
- Genre: Hardcore punk; skate punk; spoken word; crossover thrash
- Length: 3:49
- Label: Frontier
- Songwriters: Mike Muir; Louiche Mayorga
- Producer: Glen E. Friedman

Suicidal Tendencies singles chronology
"Possessed to Skate" (1987)	"Institutionalized" (1988)	"Trip at the Brain" (1988)

"Institutionalized" is a song by American crossover thrash band Suicidal Tendencies from their eponymous debut studio album (1983). It was released as a music video in 1984, and as a single in 1988. One of the band's most popular songs, it has remained a live staple since it was first played in 1982. The song was re-recorded for the band's 1993 album Still Cyco After All These Years; this version was nominated for the Grammy for Best Metal Performance in 1994, but lost to Ozzy Osbourne's live version of "I Don't Want to Change the World".

The original version of the song was featured on the long-out of print compilation album F.N.G., while the Still Cyco After All These Years version appears on Prime Cuts and Playlist: The Very Best of Suicidal Tendencies, which was not endorsed by the band. The song was also included in the 12-inch EP Institutionalised, which was released exclusively in the UK in 1988 after Suicidal Tendencies had risen in popularity.

== Song structure ==
The music was written by Louiche Mayorga when he was in Suicidal Tendencies and lyrics by Mike Muir. The story of the song follows what is presumably a teenage Muir through a series of social conflicts with friends and, more significantly, parents. The protagonist's friends notice his behavior and suggest talking about it, only for him to refuse any help. In the second verse, his mother refuses to give him a Pepsi. In the third verse, the narrator's parents, specifically his father, have a conversation with their son. Convinced that he is on drugs and needs help with his mental health, they send him away to an institution. Once again, this results in retaliation and denial from the protagonist, who suggests that everyone else needs help with their mental health. The lyrics in the verses are not sung, but spoken in a run-on sentence style. They are complemented by the lead guitar, subdued at the start of the verses, but becoming more frantic and powerful with the protagonist's confrontations and emotional outbursts.

== Reception ==
Although "Institutionalized" was never a hit in the charts, the song received regular airplay on the Los Angeles radio station KROQ, when DJ Rodney Bingenheimer added it to their playlist, and it was ranked #23 on the radio station's "Top 106.7 Songs of 1983" countdown list. "Institutionalized" was also the first hardcore punk song to receive significant airplay on MTV and is considered to be one of the songs that defines both genres. Along with "Subliminal", "I Saw Your Mommy" and "I Shot the Devil", "Institutionalized" is one of the most played songs from Suicidal Tendencies, and has frequently been performed at the band's concerts since its live debut in 1982.

== Music video ==
The original video for "Institutionalized" was premiered on MTV in 1984. Slayer's Tom Araya appears in the video, along with actors Jack Nance and Mary Woronov. The video follows Muir as he walks through the streets and skate parks of his hometown while never breaking eye contact with the camera. It features his "mom" and "dad" building Muir a homemade padded room from which he escapes with the help of his band. Muir is later seen on stage with his band, until the end of the video when he runs out and is seen driving away with his band. Although Rocky George and R.J. Herrera did not play on the album version of "Institutionalized", both can be seen on stage in the video performing the song with Suicidal Tendencies.

A video was also made for the Still Cyco After All These Years version (with Woronov reprising her role). In the video, Muir's parents are locked up and try to escape. The scientist who attempted to lobotomize Muir in the video for "Trip at the Brain" appears in the video as well.

== Usage and covers ==
A portion of the song (namely, the portion involving the request for Pepsi) is famously referenced in the 1991 Cypress Hill song “How I Could Just Kill a Man”, as well as during the second verse on the Limp Bizkit song “Stuck” off their 1997 debut album Three Dollar Bill, Y'all. A cover of the song is included in the music video game Guitar Hero II for PlayStation 2 and Xbox 360. The re-recorded version of the song from Still Cyco After All These Years was also featured in the game Mat Hoffman's Pro BMX 2 (2002). It was also popularly covered by the band Senses Fail, and this version can be heard in skateboarding video game Tony Hawk's American Wasteland (where one notable difference is that "Buddy" replaces "Mike" on the lyrics). Thrash metal band Evildead covered the main riff on their first release, the track was entitled "S.T. Riff".

The song appears in the films Iron Man, Repo Man, The Brady Bunch Movie, and also on television. In an episode from the second season of Miami Vice, the band appeared as themselves, playing it in a bar scene. The video for the song was also favorably featured in an episode of Beavis and Butt-head.

A 2012 tribute album to the Repo Man soundtrack, A Tribute to Repo Man by American Laundromat Records, featured a cover of the song by Amanda Palmer and the Grand Theft Orchestra.

"Institutionalized" is referenced in the Sage Francis song "Slow Down Gandhi" in the line "It's death penalty vs. suicidal tendencies / All I wanted was a fucking Pepsi / Institution / Making you think you're crazy is a billion dollar industry." Part of the song "My Chemical Imbalance" by punk rock band Guttermouth parodies this song. Australian band Cloud Control use the line "I'm not crazy/You're the one that's crazy" in their song "Moonrabbit" from their album Dream Cave. Limp Bizkit and Cypress Hill have both made references to the "All I wanted was a Pepsi, just one Pepsi" line.

Black Velvet Flag covered the song in a lounge style on their 1994 debut record.

A version of this song also appeared on Kiki and Herb's 2004 CD Kiki and Herb Will Die for You: Live at Carnegie Hall along with some of the character's fictional backstory on a track called "Institutionalized".

The Portland Cello Project and guitarist/vocalist Alan Sparhawk (from Minnesota bands Low and Retribution Gospel Choir) performed a version of the song in May 2012 for The A.V. Club's A.V. Undercover series.

The Radioactive Chicken Heads recorded a novelty cover of the song for their 2000 album Keep On Cluckin', featuring high-pitched vocals mirroring Alvin and the Chipmunks. According to lead singer Carrot Topp, the choice to record the cover as such stemmed from his disappointment with the song selection on the 1980 Chipmunks album Chipmunk Punk. The cover was later re-released on their 2009 rarities album Poultry Uprising.

An April 17, 2006 edition of the web comic Achewood features the song as a cellphone ringtone used by character Roast Beef Kazenzakis.

Body Count covered the song on their 2014 album Manslaughter as "Institutionalized 2014", with different lyrics in the verses to reflect current social issues.

Andy Merrill has covered the song in the character of Brak from the animated television show Space Ghost Coast To Coast for a Dr. Demento compilation of punk covers.
