= Made It =

Made It may refer to:

- "Made It", song by Brett Kissel from The Compass Project
- "Made It", song by Infectious Grooves from Groove Family Cyco
- "Made It", song by Rich the Kid from The World is Yours
- "Made It (Outro)", song by Gucci Mane from album Mr. Davis
