= Lost My Brain! (Once Again) =

Studio album by Cyco Miko
- Released: January 16, 1996
- Studio: Titan Studios, California
- Genre: Punk rock, hardcore punk
- Length: 51:53
- Label: Epic
- Producer: Michael Vail Blum, Mike Muir

Cyco Miko chronology
Lost My Brain! (Once Again) (1996)	Schizophrenic Born Again Problem Child (2001)

Professional ratings
Review scores
Source	Rating
AllMusic	2/5 stars

Lost My Brain! (Once Again) is the first of two solo albums from Mike "Cyco Miko" Muir – lead singer of Suicidal Tendencies and Infectious Grooves. It was released in January 1996 on the Epic Records label. 2001 saw the release of a follow-up album, Schizophrenic Born Again Problem Child.

Musically, it is more akin to the hardcore punk of Suicidal Tendencies albums to come – namely Freedumb in 1999 – rather than of old, and certainly unlike the funk metal of Infectious Grooves, in spite of the fact that many of the musicians performed for both bands. The title track later appeared, with changed lyrics, under the name "Big Fat Baby" on the Suicidal Records compilation, Friends & Family, Vol. 1 in 1997.

All the songs from this album (except "Cyco Miko Wants You" and "Ain't Mess'n Around") were re-recorded for Suicidal Tendencies' 2018 album Still Cyco Punk After All These Years.

== Track listing ==
All songs written by Cyco Miko.

1. "I Love Destruction" – 2:55
2. "All I Ever Get" – 4:15
3. "F.U.B.A.R." – 2:50
4. "All Kinda Crazy" – 5:09
5. "Gonna Be Alright" – 4:32
6. "Save a Peace for Me" – 6:25
7. "Nothing to Lose" – 4:02
8. "Ain't Gonna Get Me" – 3:27
9. "Lost My Brain Once Again" – 4:09
10. "It's Always Something" – 3:38
11. "Cyco Miko Wants You" – 4:31
12. "Ain't Mess'n Around" – 5:55

== Credits ==
- Mike "Cyco Miko" Muir – vocals
- Steve Jones – guitar, except tracks 7, 8, 10, 11
- Adam Siegel – guitar, except tracks 1, 9, 12
- Dave Kushner – guitar, except tracks 1–4, 9, 12
- Dave Silva – bass
- Greg Saenz – drums
- Recorded at Titan Studios, California
- Produced and mixed by Michael Vail Blum and Mike Muir
- Engineered by Michael Vail Blum
- Mixed at Saturn Sound, California
- Mastered by Kevin Hayunga at Sony Music Studios
- Cover photography by Adam Siegel
