= Controlled by Hatred/Feel Like Shit... Déjà Vu =

1989 studio album by Suicidal Tendencies

Controlled by Hatred / Feel Like Shit… Déjà Vu

Studio album of re-recorded songs by Suicidal Tendencies
- Released: October 17, 1989
- Recorded: 1988–1989
- Genre: Crossover thrash; thrash metal
- Length: 39:35
- Label: Epic
- Producer: Suicidal Tendencies; Paul Winger; Mark Dodson

Suicidal Tendencies chronology
How Will I Laugh Tomorrow When I Can't Even Smile Today (1988)	Controlled by Hatred / Feel Like Shit… Déjà Vu (1989)	Lights... Camera... Revolution! (1990)

Singles from Controlled by Hatred / Feel Like Shit… Déjà Vu
- 1. "Waking the Dead" Released: 1989; 2. "How Will I Laugh Tomorrow (Heavy Emotion Version)" Released: 1989

Controlled by Hatred / Feel Like Shit… Déjà Vu is the fourth album by American crossover thrash band Suicidal Tendencies, released on October 17, 1989, by Epic Records. Despite containing re-recorded songs of previously released material, Controlled by Hatred / Feel Like Shit… Déjà Vu is still considered a studio album rather than an EP or a compilation album. It includes four covers of No Mercy, a cover of Los Cycos ("It's Not Easy"), two never-before released tracks ("Just Another Love Song" and "Feel Like Shit… Déjà Vu") and two different versions of "How Will I Laugh Tomorrow" (from the band's 1988 album with the same title): the "video edited" version and the "heavy emotion" version. Controlled by Hatred is the first of two Suicidal Tendencies albums to go gold.

== Album information ==
The album itself is represented as two fictional EPs―the first four tracks are labeled as Controlled by Hatred and the remaining five are labeled as Feel Like Shit… Déjà Vu. It features six new recordings―four of which are covers of No Mercy songs, one is a cover of Los Cycos, an outtake from the previous album's sessions, a shortened version of "How Will I Laugh Tomorrow" (as it is heard in the song's video) and the previously unreleased softer "Heavy Emotion" version of that song. The format of Controlled by Hatred / Feel Like Shit… Déjà Vu has caused confusion. Although it has been referred to as either a compilation album or "a double EP", it is technically the band's fourth full-length studio album.

When the album was recorded in 1989, Suicidal Tendencies did not have an official bassist. Bob Heathcote left the band shortly after the end of the How Will I Laugh Tomorrow tour, although he did play on both versions of the title track from that album. The identity of the "Stymee" name credited as a bassist on the liner notes of Controlled by Hatred has confused. Contrary to popular belief, "Stymee" is not then-new bassist Robert Trujillo who did not perform on the album, in which the bass parts were handled by guitarists Rocky George and Mike Clark. The "Stymee" name was actually an acronym of a quote from Trujillo, who reportedly refused to be credited by his given name, and said "It's S.T. why me." Trujillo can, however, be seen in the album's accompanying videos "Waking the Dead" and the "heavy emotion version" of "How Will I Laugh Tomorrow".

Suicidal Tendencies rarely play any songs from this album live. "Waking the Dead" was one of three songs from Controlled by Hatred / Feel Like Shit… Déjà Vu (along with "Master of No Mercy" and "Feel Like Shit… Déjà Vu") that Suicidal Tendencies debuted on their summer 1989 European tour, and remained a live staple until 1994. It was played again on the Freedumb tour in 1999-2000 and the Join the Army / Deja Vu tour in 2010. The band played "Feel Like Shit… Déjà Vu" for the first time since 1990 at the Electric Ballroom in London on June 27, 2009, and again on their 2012 and 2013 tours. "Master of No Mercy" and "Controlled By Hatred" were last played in 1989 and 1990 respectively, while "Just Another Love Song", "Choosing My Own Way of Life" and "It's Not Easy" have never been played live.

== Reception ==
Professional ratings
Review scores
Source	Rating
Allmusic	3.5/5 stars
New Musical Express	7/10

Controlled by Hatred / Feel Like Shit… Déjà Vu received a positive review from Allmusic's Eduardo Rivadavia, who awards the album three-and-a-half stars out of five, and states, "ST fanatics will no doubt get a kick out of these rarities, which also provide a nice link between [How Will I Laugh Tomorrow] and 1990's stellar follow-up, Lights...Camera...Revolution!."

The album was only a minor success, peaking at #150 on the Billboard 200, making it Suicidal Tendencies' third lowest chart position (their 2013 album 13 and 2016 follow-up World Gone Mad debuted at #187 and #192 respectively). It remained on that chart for five weeks. Music videos for "Waking the Dead" and "How Will I Laugh Tomorrow (Heavy Emotion Version)" were made to promote this release.

== Track listing ==
Controlled by Hatred
No.	Title	Writer(s)	Length
1.	"Master of No Mercy"	Mike Muir, Mike Clark	2:38
2.	"How Will I Laugh Tomorrow" (Video Edit)	Muir, Clark	4:41
3.	"Just Another Love Song"	Muir, Rocky George, Clark	3:16
4.	"Waking the Dead"	Muir, Clark	6:54

Feel Like Shit… Déjà Vu
No.	Title	Writer(s)	Length
5.	"Controlled by Hatred"	Muir, Clark	5:38
6.	"Choosing My Own Way of Life"	Muir, Clark	3:05
7.	"Feel Like Shit… Déjà Vu"	Muir, George	2:53
8.	"It's Not Easy"	Muir	3:59
9.	"How Will I Laugh Tomorrow" (Heavy Emotion Version)	Muir, Clark	6:31

=== Song notes ===
- "Master of No Mercy", "Waking the Dead", "Controlled by Hatred" and "Choosing My Own Way of Life" were compositions by guitarist Mike Clark's previous band No Mercy.
- The "Video Edit" version of "How Will I Laugh Tomorrow" is an edited version of the album version.
- "Just Another Love Song" is an outtake from the recording sessions of How Will I Laugh Tomorrow When I Can't Even Smile Today.
- "Feel Like Shit… Déjà Vu" was a newly recorded track.
- "It's Not Easy" was written in 1984/1985 by frontman Mike Muir for a short-lived project called Los Cycos.
- The "Heavy Emotion Version" of "How Will I Laugh Tomorrow" is a clean (almost acoustic) version of the original, but still features a guitar solo by Rocky George.

== Personnel ==
- Mike Muir – lead vocals
- Rocky George – lead guitar, bass (uncredited)
- R. J. Herrera – drums
- Mike Clark – rhythm guitar, bass (uncredited)
- Bob Heathcote – bass on "Just Another Love Song" and both versions of "How Will I Laugh Tomorrow" (uncredited)
- Robert Trujillo – bass – appeared in the videos that promoted the album ("Waking the Dead" and "How Will I Laugh Tomorrow (Heavy Emotion Version)"), however he was not a band member yet at the time the album was being recorded. He joined shortly after the album's completion and refused to be credited by his name, despite the rumour that the "Stymee" in the liner notes was him (Stymee meant "S. T. why me"). Bass parts were recorded by the two guitarists (Rocky George and Mike Clark) and Bob Heathcote.
- Produced by Suicidal Tendencies and Paul Winger, except tracks 2 and 9 produced by Suicidal Tendencies and Mark Dodson
- Engineered by Paul Winger, except tracks 2 and 9
- Assistant engineered by Tom Nellen, except tracks 2 and 9

== Chart positions ==
=== Album ===
Billboard (North America)

Year	Chart	Position
1989	Billboard 200	150

== Certifications ==
Region	Certification	Certified units/sales
United States (RIAA)	Gold	500,000^{^}
^{^} Shipments figures based on certification alone.
