= Mike Clark (guitarist) =

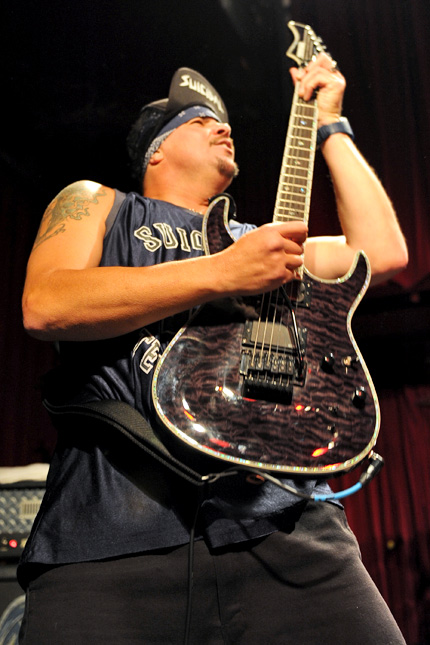
- Mike Clark performing with Suicidal Tendencies in 2011

Background information
- Born: October 28, 1964 (age 61); Los Angeles, California, United States
- Genres: Thrash metal, funk metal, hardcore punk, heavy metal
- Instrument: Guitar
- Years active: 1982–present

Mike Clark (born October 28, 1964) is an American heavy metal and punk rock guitarist. He is best known for being the rhythm guitarist with Suicidal Tendencies, a band he played with from 1987 to 2012, and was the only member besides Mike Muir to return to the band when it reunited. He originally played in the thrash metal band No Mercy of which Muir was also the vocalist. During Suicidal Tendencies' hiatus he was a member of the thrash/rap rock band Creeper.

Throughout his time with Suicidal Tendencies, Clark was very active in the band's songwriting, writing much of the music for his first album with the band, How Will I Laugh Tomorrow When I Can't Even Smile Today. His early compositions were mostly thrash-oriented but stuck to the band's already melodic sound. He continued to write music for the band that covered many different styles, best illustrated by The Art of Rebellion. As Clark claimed in an interview, "This is definitely our most diverse album yet, but it wasn't really planned that way, it's just the way we've grown musically."

Clark has had endorsement deals with B.C. Rich, Jackson and Yamaha guitars. He used to play a custom made BC Rich Gunslinger guitar with a skull wearing the classic Suicidal flip cap painted on it. Since the mid-1990s, he has played only Fernandes guitars, which he continues to endorse. Clark's early trademark image was his straight long hair and the "Suicidal" flip-cap. He has since cut his hair and began wearing a blue bandana.

On May 31, 2012, in Santa Cruz, California, Clark suffered a head injury during a pre-show incident resulting in concussion that also required nine staples to a gash on his head. This prompted Clark to leave Suicidal Tendencies. He did, however, provide rhythm guitar on four tracks from the band's 2013 album 13 ("Shake It Out", "God Only Knows Who I Am", "Who's Afraid?" and "Cyco Style"), where he is credited as an "additional musician".

On June 6, 2012, a music video by one of Clark's bands, Phenagen, was released.

Clark contributed original music for the documentary Mind of the Demon: The Larry Linkogle Story about professional motocross rider Larry Linkogle, where he is credited as a theme music composer. He is also credited as a theme music composer for all eight episodes of the Gumball 3000 Super Car TV series Rally On.

Clark has a daughter named Christina as well as a brother named Richard Clark, who has a son named Richard Clark Jr.

== Discography ==
=== with No Mercy ===
- Widespread Bloodshed Love Runs Red (1987)
- OG No Mercy (2008)

=== with Suicidal Tendencies ===
- How Will I Laugh Tomorrow When I Can't Even Smile Today (1988)
- Controlled by Hatred/Feel Like Shit...Déjà Vu (1989)
- Lights...Camera...Revolution! (1990)
- The Art of Rebellion (1992)
- Still Cyco After All These Years (1993)
- Suicidal for Life (1994)
- Prime Cuts (1997)
- Six the Hard Way EP (1998)
- Freedumb (1999)
- Free Your Soul and Save My Mind (2000)
- Year of the Cycos (2008)
- No Mercy Fool!/The Suicidal Family (2010)
- 13 (2013)

=== with Great Gods of Greed ===
- Great Gods of Greed (2012)

=== Compilations ===
- Friends & Family, Vol. 1 (1997)
