= Rocky George =

American guitarist

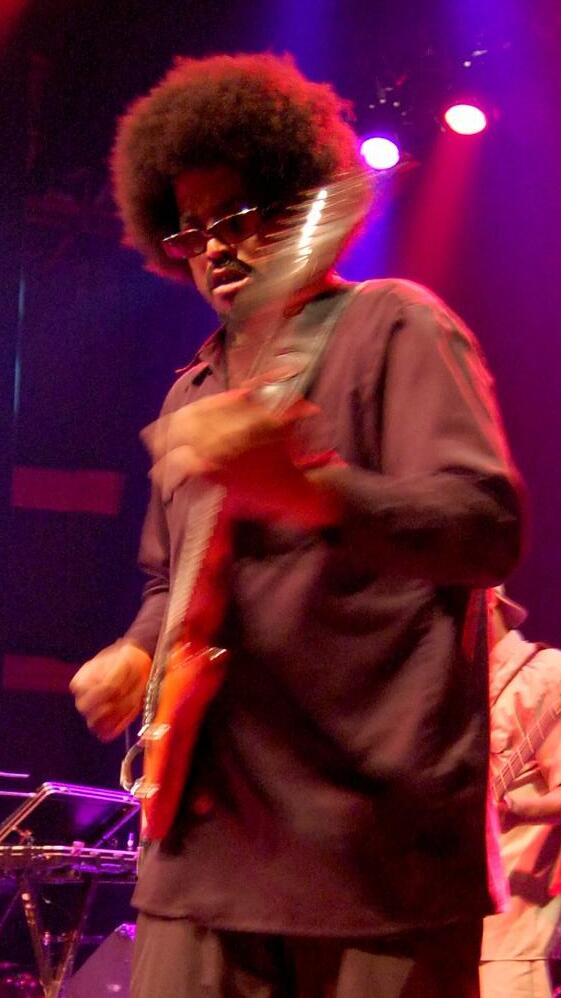
- George performing with Fishbone in 2008

Background information
- Born: Leonard F. George; January 9, 1965 (age 61); Culver City, California, U.S.
- Genres: Heavy metal; thrash metal; funk metal; hardcore punk
- Instrument: Guitar
- Years active: 1982–present
- Member of: Cro-Mags
- Formerly of: Suicidal Tendencies, Fishbone, Harley's War, 40 Cycle Hum, Pap Smear

Leonard F. George (born January 9, 1965), best known by his stage name Rocky George, is an American guitarist who has been a member of several notable musical acts, including Suicidal Tendencies, where he was their lead guitarist from 1984 to their first breakup in 1995, and was the first African-American member of the band. After Suicidal Tendencies, George played with 40 Cycle Hum and Cro-Mags, and in 2003, he joined Fishbone. George was also a member of a local punk rock band called Pap Smear with Jeff Hanneman and Dave Lombardo. In 2019, George returned to the Cro-Mags lineup.

== Biography ==
During his tenure with Suicidal Tendencies, George joined a short-lived punk side project called "Pap Smear", formed by Slayer members Jeff Hanneman and Dave Lombardo. Although Pap Smear has never released any records, two of their songs were re-recorded on Slayer's 1996 covers album Undisputed Attitude. George joined Suicidal Tendencies in 1984, replacing Jon Nelson, who replaced the first album's guitarist Grant Estes. His debut with the band was Welcome to Venice on the song "Look Up...(The Boys Are Back)" written by Jon Nelson and Mike Muir. George is largely considered responsible for moving Suicidal Tendencies away from their hardcore punk roots into a more thrash oriented territory. He is also responsible for Robert Trujillo joining the band, who was a friend of his at Culver City High School.

George joined Fishbone in 2003 and played on the 2006 studio album Still Stuck in Your Throat plus two EPs. In 2008, after thirteen years, George played with his former bandmates during an Infectious Grooves set. He left Fishbone in 2017 when that band's classic lineup reunited.

== Instruments ==
George has used Ibanez guitars almost exclusively for years (particularly the RG series). He is still endorsed by Ibanez. Despite rumors, however, Rocky did not design the Ibanez RG series, as "RG" stands for "Roadstar Guitar", not "Rocky George". He is also a long time user of Mesa Boogie amplifiers and the BBE 482i Sonic Maximizer, a signal processor used to produce a cleaner sound from the amplifier.

== Discography ==
=== Suicidal Tendencies ===
- Welcome to Venice (1985)
- Join the Army (1987)
- How Will I Laugh Tomorrow When I Can't Even Smile Today (1988)
- Controlled by Hatred/Feel Like Shit...Deja Vu (1989)
- Lights...Camera...Revolution! (1990)
- The Art of Rebellion (1992)
- Still Cyco After All These Years (1993)
- Suicidal for Life (1994)

=== Cro-Mags ===
- Revenge (2000)
- In the Beginning (2020)

=== With Harley's War ===
- Cro-Mag (2003)
- Hardcore All-Stars (2009)
- 2012 (2012)

=== Fishbone ===
- Still Stuck in Your Throat (2006)
- Crazy Glue (EP, 2011)
- Intrinsically Intertwined (EP, 2014)
