= The Art of Rebellion =

Studio album by Suicidal Tendencies
- Released: June 30, 1992
- Recorded: November 1991 – February 1992
- Studios: Ocean Way Studios (Hollywood, CA) and Ground Control Studios (Santa Monica, California)
- Genres: Alternative metal, crossover thrash
- Length: 58:07
- Label: Epic
- Producer: Peter Collins

Suicidal Tendencies chronology
Lights... Camera... Revolution! (1990)	The Art of Rebellion (1992)	Still Cyco After All These Years (1993)

Singles from The Art of Rebellion
- 1. "Nobody Hears" Released: 1992; 2. "Asleep at the Wheel" Released: 1992; 3. "I'll Hate You Better" Released: 1993

The Art of Rebellion is the sixth studio album by American crossover thrash band Suicidal Tendencies, released in 1992 on Epic Records. It was the only Suicidal Tendencies album to be recorded without an official drummer; the drum tracks were handled by Josh Freese, filling in for the departed R.J. Herrera. The Art of Rebellion maintains its position as the band's most commercially successful studio album to date, and the songs "Nobody Hears" and "I'll Hate You Better" have the distinction of being the only top 40 hits (radio or otherwise) in Suicidal Tendencies' career.

== Album information ==
Released in the wake of the success of grunge and alternative rock, The Art of Rebellion is widely considered to be Suicidal's "experimental" album. Mike Clark has acknowledged this. Clark also mentioned that the album was not planned that way, and was just a reflection of the band's musical growth. The songs show the band's continuing experimentation that had begun on its predecessor, Lights...Camera...Revolution!, as well as more progressive song structures, a somewhat more alternative atmosphere, and even pop-oriented sounds. This helped the band not only outride the explosion of alternative in the early 1990s, it also helped them gain a fan base within that community. Nonetheless, the album still stays true to the band's thrash and punk roots on many of the songs.

At almost 60 minutes long, The Art of Rebellion was Suicidal Tendencies' longest album to date, until 2013's 13. Singles to promote the album were "Nobody Hears", "Asleep at the Wheel", and "I'll Hate You Better"; the music videos for each single gained substantial airplay by Headbangers Ball on MTV.

Longtime drummer R.J. Herrera left Suicidal Tendencies just prior to the album's recording sessions. Instead of replacing him, the remaining members opted to record as a four-piece and were joined by Josh Freese of The Vandals, who is credited as a session drummer on the album and does not appear in any of the photos on the insert. For the accompanying tour for The Art of Rebellion, Herrera was replaced by former Y&T and White Lion drummer Jimmy DeGrasso, who would stay in Suicidal Tendencies until the band's initial breakup in 1995.

== Reception ==
Professional ratings
Review scores
Source	Rating
AllMusic	4/5 stars
Collector's Guide to Heavy Metal	9/10
Entertainment Weekly	B−
Q	4/5 stars

The Art of Rebellion peaked at number 52 on the Billboard 200, and received generally positive reviews from critics.

Deborah Frost of Entertainment Weekly gave the album a positive review, though noted:

He's [Mike Muir] no longer the community revolutionary, compared with bad neighbors like Ice-T, and he has been crowded off the funk-fusion wagon by hotter Chili Peppers. What's more, Nirvana and Metallica have yelled The Art of Rebellion's teen alien themes like real rebels and better artists. It's hard to be convincing when your band can only offer hardcore cliches that your producer only Roger Waters-down. Even the best song, the power ballad Asleep at the Wheel, is a little too close to dinosaur rock for comfort. But rising for the first time above the thrash, Muir's experiments — particularly with uncanny, Ray Davies-like vocals — suggest that there may be life after suicide yet.

== Track listing ==
No.	Title	Writer(s)	Length
1.	"Can't Stop"	Mike Muir	6:39
2.	"Accept My Sacrifice"	Muir, Robert Trujillo	3:30
3.	"Nobody Hears"	Muir, Rocky George	5:34
4.	"Tap into the Power"	Muir, Mike Clark	3:43
5.	"Monopoly on Sorrow"	Muir	5:13
6.	"We Call This Mutha Revenge"	Muir, Clark	4:51
7.	"I Wasn't Meant to Feel This/Asleep at the Wheel"	Muir	7:07
8.	"Gotta Kill Captain Stupid"	Muir, Clark	4:02
9.	"I'll Hate You Better"	Muir, Clark	4:18
10.	"Which Way to Free?"	Muir, George	4:30
11.	"It's Going Down"	Muir	4:27
12.	"Where's the Truth?"	Muir, George	4:14
Total length:			58:08

== Credits ==
Suicidal Tendencies

- Mike Muir – vocals
- Rocky George – lead guitar
- Mike Clark – rhythm guitar
- Robert Trujillo – bass

Additional musicians

- Josh Freese – drums
- John Webster – keyboards
- Dennis Karmazyn – cello

== Chart positions ==
Year	Chart	Position
1992	U.S. Billboard 200	52
