= Suicidal for Life =

Studio album by Suicidal Tendencies
- Released: June 14, 1994
- Recorded: October 1993 – March 1994
- Studios: Ocean Way (Hollywood); Groove Masters (Santa Monica, California)
- Genres: Crossover thrash, funk metal
- Length: 48:58
- Label: Epic
- Producers: Paul Northfield, Suicidal Tendencies

Suicidal Tendencies chronology
Still Cyco After All These Years (1993)	Suicidal for Life (1994)	Prime Cuts (1997)

Singles from Suicidal for Life
- 1. "What You Need's a Friend" Released: June 6, 1994; 2. "Love vs. Loneliness" Released: 1994

Professional ratings
Review scores
Source	Rating
Allmusic	1.5/5 stars
Collector's Guide to Heavy Metal	8/10

Suicidal for Life is the eighth studio album by American crossover thrash band Suicidal Tendencies, which was released in 1994. It is their sixth full-length album with original material, and their last album to feature lead guitarist Rocky George and bassist Robert Trujillo as well as their only one to feature drummer Jimmy DeGrasso. Suicidal for Life was also Suicidal Tendencies' final studio album released on Epic Records and their last one before their temporary breakup in 1995–1996.

== Overview ==
Suicidal for Life was considered controversial among fans and critics, partly due to the album containing four consecutive songs with the word "fuck" in the title. By 1994, Suicidal Tendencies had become increasingly weary of their newfound fame following the massive success of Lights...Camera...Revolution! and The Art of Rebellion; as a result, with Suicidal for Life, the band decided to tone down the accessible aspects of their sound in favor of a more aggressive style than its predecessor. Frontman Mike Muir recalled to Loudwire of this era, saying: "We're not for everybody, we never were supposed to be, we're not supposed to be a big band. We got bigger than we should have been, but, fortunately not big as other bands are - we'd probably be very unhappy. But I think what we do has meant a lot to other people and to be able to have an opportunity to go out there and people discover you, and still discover you, and appreciate what you're doing. You can tell that - I believe we're doing it for the right reasons."

== Reception ==
The critical reception of Suicidal for Life was lackluster. AllMusic writer Eduardo Rivadavia gave the album an average of 1.5 out five stars, writing, "Suicidal Tendencies' long relationship with Epic Records came to an end with 1994's Suicidal for Life and, as expected, the breakup was not a pretty one. The label's inability to introduce any of the group's groundbreaking albums to a significantly wider audience certainly didn't sit well with ST main man Mike Muir, who decided to run through the motions while being as gratuitously offensive as possible on this contractually necessary release."

Even though the album failed to live up to the expectations of Suicidal Tendencies' previous releases, commercial and otherwise, Suicidal for Life peaked at number 82 on the Billboard 200 chart, making it their second highest-chart entry behind The Art of Rebellion, which peaked at number 52. Among the album's songs, "What You Need's a Friend" had garnered airplay through radio (most notably from KNAC in Los Angeles), while a music video was shot for "Love vs. Loneliness" but received only limited airplay on MTV.

Suicidal Tendencies have rarely played any songs from Suicidal for Life since their reunion in 1996, though "Fucked Up Just Right!" was played live again briefly in 2012. "What Else Could I Do?", "What You Need's a Friend", "Depression and Anguish", "Evil" and "Love vs. Loneliness" have never been performed live.

== Track listing ==
No.	Title	Writer(s)	Length
1.	"Invocation"	Mike Muir, Rocky George, Robert Trujillo	0:59
2.	"Don't Give a Fuck"	Muir, Mike Clark	2:47
3.	"No Fuck'n Problem"	Muir, Clark	3:31
4.	"Suicyco Muthafucka"	Muir, Clark, George	4:28
5.	"Fucked Up Just Right"	Muir, Clark	4:58
6.	"No Bullshit"	Muir, George	3:13
7.	"What Else Could I Do?"	Muir, George, Trujillo, Clark	6:00
8.	"What You Need's a Friend"	Muir, Clark, Trujillo, George	3:56
9.	"I Wouldn't Mind"	Muir, Trujillo, Clark	4:23
10.	"Depression and Anguish"	Muir, Clark	3:03
11.	"Evil"	Muir, George	3:44
12.	"Love vs. Loneliness"	Muir, Clark, George	6:57
13.	"Benediction"	Muir, George, Trujillo	1:01

Japanese edition bonus track
No.	Title	Writer(s)	Length
14.	"Two Worlds Collide"	Mike Muir	3:37

== Personnel ==
- Mike "Cyco Miko" Muir – vocals
- Rocky George – lead guitar
- Mike Clark – rhythm guitar
- Robert Trujillo – bass
- Jimmy DeGrasso – drums
- Recorded at Ocean Way Studios, Hollywood, and Groove Masters, Santa Monica, US
- Produced by Paul Northfield and Suicidal Tendencies
- Engineered and mixed by Paul Northfield
- Mixed at Skip Saylor Studios, Hollywood, US
- Assisted by Mark Guilbault, Ray Taylor-Smith. Bob Salcedo, and Eric Flickinger
- Mastered by Brian Gardner at Bernie Grundman Mastering Studios

== Chart positions ==
=== Album ===
Billboard (North America)

Year	Chart	Position
1994	The Billboard 200	82
