= Six the Hard Way =

EP by Suicidal Tendencies
- Released: November 17, 1998
- Recorded: Ocean Studios; Skip Saylor; Live in France
- Genre: Crossover thrash, hardcore punk
- Length: 20:19
- Label: Suicidal Records
- Producer: Paul Northfield; Suicidal Tendencies

Suicidal Tendencies chronology
Friends & Family, Vol. 1 (1997)	Six the Hard Way (1998)	Freedumb (1999)

Six the Hard Way is the first EP by crossover thrash band Suicidal Tendencies, released on November 17, 1998. Until 2018's Get Your Fight On!, this was the only EP the band had released.

The record features two live recordings and four new tracks. Two of the new tracks, "Freedumb" and "Cyco Vision", went on to appear on their next album the following year.

== Track listing ==
No.	Title	Writer(s)	Length
1.	"Freedumb"	Mike Muir, Josh Paul, Dean Pleasants, Mike Clark	2:55
2.	"Cyco Vision"	Muir, Clark, Paul	1:52
3.	"Refuse"	Muir, Clark, Paul, Pleasants	3:16
4.	"What's the Word?"	Muir, Clark	4:34
5.	"Fascist Pig" (Live)	Muir	1:41
6.	"I Saw Your Mommy" (Live)	Muir	6:01

- Tracks 5 and 6 were recorded at Les Eurockéennes de Belfort, France

== Credits ==
- Mike Muir – vocals
- Mike Clark – guitar
- Dean Pleasants – guitar
- Josh Paul – bass
- Brooks Wackerman – drums

=== Tracks 1–2 ===
- Recorded at Ocean Studios and Skip Saylor, Hollywood, USA
- Produced and mixed by Paul Northfield

=== Tracks 3–4 ===
- Recorded at Titan Studios, Hollywood, USA
- Produced by Suicidal Tendencies
- Engineered by Mike Blum
- Mixed by Paul Northfield at Skip Saylor Studios

=== Tracks 5–6 ===
- Recorded live at Les Eurokeennes de Belfort, France
- Mobile sound engineered by Will Shappland of the Manor Mobile
- Suicidal sound engineer – Tony Cooper
