= Freedumb =

Studio album by Suicidal Tendencies
- Released: May 18, 1999
- Recorded: 1998–1999
- Studio: Ocean Studios, Titan Studios, Skip Saylor Studios
- Genre: Skate punk, thrash metal, crossover thrash
- Length: 40:00
- Label: Suicidal Records, SideOneDummy
- Producer: Paul Northfield & Suicidal Tendencies

Suicidal Tendencies chronology
Six the Hard Way (1998)	Freedumb (1999)	Free Your Soul and Save My Mind (2000)

Professional ratings
Review scores
Source	Rating
AllMusic	1.5/5 stars
Chronicles of Chaos	7/10
The Encyclopedia of Popular Music	3/5 stars
Rock Hard	10/10

Freedumb is the ninth studio album by American crossover band Suicidal Tendencies. It was released in 1999 on Suicidal Records.

The tracks are rawer than the funk-influenced thrash metal direction they were taking before the hiatus. The album's cover art is a reference to the photo Raising the Flag on Iwo Jima taken during World War II.

== Reception ==
CMJ New Music Report wrote that the songs "display thousand-mile-an-hour, classic hardcore guitar assaults." In 2005, Freedumb was ranked number 489 in Rock Hard magazine's book of The 500 Greatest Rock & Metal Albums of All Time.

== Track listing ==
No.	Title	Writer(s)	Length
1.	"Freedumb"	Mike Muir, Josh Paul, Dean Pleasants, Mike Clark	2:52
2.	"Ain't Gonna Take It"	Muir, Clark, Pleasants	2:09
3.	"Scream Out"	Muir	2:29
4.	"Half Way Up My Head"	Muir, Pleasants	4:01
5.	"Cyco Vision"	Muir, Clark	1:49
6.	"I Ain't Like You"	Muir	2:35
7.	"Naked"	Suicidal Tendencies	3:56
8.	"Hippie Killer"	Muir	3:10
9.	"Built to Survive"	Muir	3:07
10.	"Get Sick"	Muir, Pleasants, Clark	2:58
11.	"We Are Family"	Muir, Clark	2:54
12.	"I'll Buy Myself"	Muir, Clark	1:48
13.	"Gaigan Go Home" (Gaijin Go Home on Japanese edition)	Muir, Brooks Wackerman	1:58
14.	"Heaven"	Muir, Clark	4:13
15.	"Don't Take No" (Bonus track on Japanese edition)	Muir, Clark	3:19

== Credits ==
- Mike Muir – vocals
- Dean Pleasants – lead guitar
- Mike Clark – rhythm guitar
- Brooks Wackerman – drums
- Josh Paul – bass (credited as "additional musician")

=== Tracks 1, 2, 5–10, 12, 13 ===
- Recorded at Ocean Studios and Skip Saylor Studios
- Produced by Paul Northfield and Suicidal Tendencies
- Engineered and mixed by Paul Northfield

=== Tracks 3, 4, 11, 14 ===
- Recorded at Titan Studios, except track 11 guitars at Skip Saylor
- Produced by Suicidal Tendencies
- Engineered by Michael Vail Blum
- Mixed by Paul Northfield at Skip Saylor Studios
- Mastered by Brian Gardner at Bernie Grundman Mastering Studios
