= Still Cyco After All These Years =

Studio album of re-recorded songs by Suicidal Tendencies
- Released: June 15, 1993
- Recorded: 1989–1990
- Genres: Hardcore punk; crossover thrash
- Length: 37:42
- Label: Epic
- Producers: Mark Dodson, Mike Muir

Suicidal Tendencies chronology
The Art of Rebellion (1992)	Still Cyco After All These Years (1993)	Suicidal for Life (1994)

Professional ratings
Review scores
Source	Rating
AllMusic	link
Collector's Guide to Heavy Metal	6/10

Still Cyco After All These Years is the seventh studio album by American crossover thrash band Suicidal Tendencies, released in 1993. The album is composed of re-recorded songs from the band's 1983 debut album, Suicidal Tendencies; re-recordings of "War Inside My Head" and "A Little Each Day" from the band's second album, Join the Army; and "Don't Give Me Your Nothin'" which was previously released as a B-side to "Send Me Your Money".

== Album information ==
The album was recorded in 1989–1990 during the Lights...Camera...Revolution! sessions. It contained the songs from the band's 1983 self-titled debut album. Frontman Mike Muir was upset with Frontier Records, the independent label that released Suicidal Tendencies' debut album, over various royalty and publishing issues. Since Muir did not have the rights to reissue the debut, he instead re-recorded the songs for release through Epic Records.

Singles for Still Cyco After All These Years were released for "Institutionalized" and "I Saw Your Mommy". Music videos were made for "Institutionalized" and "War Inside My Head" (previously available on the 1990 VHS Lights...Camera...Suicidal).

== Critical reception ==
Upon its release, the album received mixed reviews from music commentators, who frequently evaluated it through a comparative lens against the band's earlier work. In a contemporary review for Billboard, the record was characterized as a "compare-and-contrast gambit," as the majority of the material consisted of re-recorded tracks from the band's 1983 self-titled debut album on Frontier Records.

The publication noted substantial modifications in the sonic production of the 1993 versions, describing the updated sound as "beefier" and potentially "more radio-friendly" than the raw aesthetic of the original recordings. However, the necessity of the project was questioned for purists. It was remarked that for listeners who had the original version of the band's signature track, "Institutionalized," permanently etched into their minds, the re-recorded album might feel like a "redundant exercise," with the reviewer jokingly suggesting that such audiences might prefer to "step out for a Pepsi" instead.

== Track listing ==
All songs by Mike Muir unless otherwise noted.

No.	Title	Writer(s)	Length
1.	"Suicide's an Alternative / You'll Be Sorry"		2:26
2.	"Two-Sided Politics"	Muir, Louiche Mayorga	1:03
3.	"Subliminal"		2:48
4.	"I Shot the Devil"		1:50
5.	"Won't Fall in Love Today"		0:51
6.	"Institutionalized"	Muir, Mayorga	3:30
7.	"War Inside My Head"	Muir, Mayorga	3:29
8.	"Don't Give Me Your Nothin'"		4:04
9.	"Memories of Tomorrow"		0:55
10.	"Possessed"		2:02
11.	"I Saw Your Mommy"		4:51
12.	"Fascist Pig"		1:13
13.	"A Little Each Day"		3:52
14.	"I Want More"	Muir, Mayorga	2:09
15.	"Suicidal Failure"		2:40

== Song origins ==
- Original versions of tracks 1–6, 9–12, and 14–15 were on the album Suicidal Tendencies (1983)
- Original versions of tracks 7 and 13 were on the album Join the Army (1987)
- Track 8 was previously released as a B-side to the single "Send Me Your Money" from Lights...Camera...Revolution! (1990)

== Credits ==
- Mike Muir – lead vocals
- Rocky George – lead guitar
- Mike Clark – rhythm guitar
- Robert Trujillo – bass
- R. J. Herrera – drums (was present for the album's recording but left the band by the time of its release)
- Recorded at Rumbo Studios, vocals recorded at Titan Studio
- Produced by Mark Dodson and Mike Muir
- Engineered by Mike Dodson
- Mixed at A&M Studios

== Chart positions ==
=== Album ===
Billboard (North America)

Year	Chart	Position
1993	Billboard 200	117
