= Lights...Camera...Revolution! =

Lights... Camera... Revolution!

Studio album by Suicidal Tendencies
- Released: July 3, 1990
- Recorded: December 1989 – April 1990
- Studios: Rumbo (Los Angeles); Amigo (Hollywood)
- Genres: Thrash metal; funk metal
- Length: 42:52
- Label: Epic
- Producers: Mark Dodson; Suicidal Tendencies

Suicidal Tendencies chronology
Controlled by Hatred/Feel Like Shit... Déjà Vu (1989)	Lights... Camera... Revolution! (1990)	The Art of Rebellion (1992)

Singles from Lights...Camera...Revolution!
- 1. "You Can't Bring Me Down" Released: 1990; 2. "Send Me Your Money" Released: 1990; 3. "Alone" Released: 1991; 4. "Lovely" Released: 1991

Lights... Camera... Revolution! is the fifth studio album by American crossover thrash band Suicidal Tendencies, released in 1990. This was the band's first release with bassist Robert Trujillo and their last studio album with drummer R.J. Herrera.

== Music and lyrics ==
This album shows the band straying further away from their roots as a crossover thrash band and moving towards a traditional thrash metal style. The song arrangements are more complex, as are the lyrics. This was also the first Suicidal Tendencies album to display funk influences, which can be attributed to the input of then-new bassist Robert Trujillo.

== Cover art ==
The album cover was taken at the Vista Theatre located at 4473 Sunset Drive in Los Feliz. It shows Mike Clark, R. J. Herrera and Robert Trujillo standing on top of the theater behind the "Vista" sign, while Rocky George and Mike Muir appear on the top right window of the building.

== Release and reception ==
Professional ratings
Review scores
Source	Rating
AllMusic	4/5 stars
Collector's Guide to Heavy Metal	7/10
Select	3/5
The Village Voice	(choice cut)

Singles from this album included "You Can't Bring Me Down", "Send Me Your Money", "Alone" and "Lovely". The video for "You Can't Bring Me Down" received much MTV airplay, and was largely responsible for the success of this album. It was certified gold a few years later. It was also nominated for the "Best Metal Performance" Grammy Award in 1991, losing to "Stone Cold Crazy" by Metallica, whom Trujillo would join in 2003. Loudwire's Eduardo Rivadavia later ranked Lights... Camera... Revolution! at number eight on their top ten list of "Thrash Albums NOT Released by the Big 4".

AllMusic's Alex Henderson described the record as "one of its [the band's] best albums ever" and "a disc that no Suicidal fan should be without," further writing: "Not since the mid-'80s had the L.A. band sounded this confident, focused and inspired." The Village Voice critic Robert Christgau noted the track "You Can't Bring Me Down" as a choice cut from the album.

== Track listing ==
No.	Title	Writer(s)	Length
1.	"You Can't Bring Me Down"	Mike Muir, Rocky George	5:50
2.	"Lost Again"	Muir, George	5:16
3.	"Alone"	Muir, Mike Clark	4:24
4.	"Lovely"	Muir, Clark, Robert Trujillo	3:45
5.	"Give It Revolution"	Muir, Clark, R. J. Herrera	4:22
6.	"Get Whacked"	Muir, Clark	4:23
7.	"Send Me Your Money"	Muir	3:24
8.	"Emotion No. 13"	Muir, George	3:43
9.	"Disco's Out, Murder's In"	Muir, Clark, Herrera	3:07
10.	"Go'n Breakdown"	Muir, Clark	4:39

== Credits ==
- Mike Muir – lead vocals
- Rocky George – lead guitar, backing vocals
- Mike Clark – rhythm guitar, backing vocals
- Robert Trujillo – bass, backing vocals
- R. J. Herrera – drums
- Recorded at Rumbo Recorders, Canoga Park, California, and Amigo Studios, Hollywood, California
- Produced by Mark Dodson and Suicidal Tendencies
- Engineered and mixed by Mark Dodson
- Additionally engineered by Chris Steinmetz, Brian Scheuble, Greg Goldman, and Andy Udoff
- Mixed at A&M Recording Studio, Hollywood, California

== Chart positions ==
Chart (1990)	Peak position
Billboard 200	101

== Certifications ==
Region	Certification	Certified units/sales
United States (RIAA)	Gold	500,000^{^}
^{^} Shipments figures based on certification alone.
