= Suicidal Tendencies (album) =

Studio album by Suicidal Tendencies
- Released: July 5, 1983
- Recorded: February 1983
- Studio: Golden Age Recording in Hollywood, California
- Genre: Hardcore punk; skate punk
- Length: 28:17
- Label: Frontier (FLP 011)
- Producer: Glen E. Friedman

Suicidal Tendencies chronology
Suicidal Tendencies (1983)	Join the Army (1987)

Singles from Suicidal Tendencies
- 1. "Institutionalized" Released: 1988

Suicidal Tendencies is the debut studio album by American crossover thrash band Suicidal Tendencies, released on July 5, 1983 through Frontier Records. Regarded as one of the best-selling and most successful hardcore punk albums, Suicidal Tendencies was well-received by fans and critics alike, and the airplay of its only single "Institutionalized" (for which its music video was one of the first in the genre to get airplay on MTV) brought the band considerable popularity. The album was a major influence on the then-emerging genre of thrash metal and its subgenre crossover thrash.

== Album information ==
The cover of Suicidal Tendencies features an image of the band members hanging upside down, taken by Glen E. Friedman, who produced the album. The background on both the front and back cover depict various homemade Suicidal Tendencies T-shirts.

"I Shot the Devil" was originally entitled "I Shot Reagan". The band is rumored to have been approached by the FBI to change the name of the song. The group eventually used the original title of the song on the lyrics sheet.

Guitarist Jon Nelson was credited on early pressings of the album, but this was corrected to list Grant Estes. Nelson had already left the band before the album project began. In 1989, due to various royalty and publishing issues with Frontier Records, Muir and the later incarnation of the band re-recorded the entire album and released it in 1993 as Still Cyco After All These Years, with (mostly) faithful recreations of the originals, plus two songs from Join the Army and one previously unreleased song "Don't Give Me Your Nothin'".

== Reception ==
Professional ratings
Review scores
Source	Rating
AllMusic	4.5/5 stars
Q	4/5 stars

Suicidal Tendencies has received mostly positive reviews and ratings. Steve Huey of AllMusic gave the album 4.5/5 stars and called the album "fast, furious, and funny" and claimed that it "owed much more to hardcore punk than to the later hardcore/heavy metal hybrid they would become known for, but it's still quite possibly their best album." Huey added that "Mike Muir proves himself an articulate lyricist and commentator, delving into subjects like alienation, depression, and nonconformist politics with intelligence and humor." Pushead of Maximumrocknroll described Suicidal Tendencies as "blistering rough-arsed metal thrash" and called the band "a screaming cyclone of sheer power and determination". Pushead also claimed that "this LP shows why they have such a strong following."

Critic Ira Robbins writes that "Half-sung, half-recited and built on repeated sudden tempo changes, 'Institutionalized' is a unique, devastating centerpiece. One of the era's quintessential expressions of teen dislocation, it converts generation gap misunderstandings into a complete communications breakdown, encapsulating all the punk sociology of such films as Repo Man and Suburbia in four minutes."

== Influence and legacy ==
Suicidal Tendencies has been regarded by critics as one of the most influential rock albums of all time, and has inspired a number of musicians. Anthrax guitarist Scott Ian listed it in his "Top 10 Thrash Albums" list, stating "I just think it's a perfect album. Every song on it is great. It's a perfect crossover between hardcore punk and metal, and I guess that's what makes thrash metal -- all those genre combined, and Suicidal were the first ones to do it because that record came out in '83." Suicidal Tendencies has also been cited as an influence or favorite album by each of the "big four" of thrash metal (Metallica, Megadeth, Slayer and Anthrax) as well as California punk bands such as The Offspring and NOFX.

"Institutionalized" has been referenced in many songs, mostly its quote "all I wanted was a Pepsi". It is referenced in the Sage Francis song "Slow Down Gandhi" in the line "It's death penalty vs. suicidal tendencies / All I wanted was a fucking Pepsi / Institution / Making you think you're crazy is a billion dollar industry." Limp Bizkit also referenced it in the song "Stuck" with the lines "All I wanted was a Pepsi, just one Pepsi. So far from suicidal but still I get them tendencies bringing back the memories that I really miss." "All I wanted was a Pepsi" is also quoted near the ending of the Cypress Hill song "How I Could Just Kill a Man". American heavy metal band Body Count recorded a cover version of "Institutionalized", with new lyrics written by singer Ice-T, called "Institutionalized 2014", for their album Manslaughter.

"Memories of Tomorrow" was covered by Slayer for its album Undisputed Attitude and was featured on the Japanese edition of the record. "Institutionalized" was also covered by Senses Fail for the soundtrack to the video game Tony Hawk's American Wasteland. "Two Sided Politics" was covered by Bones Brigade on its album Older Than Shit, Heavier Than Time. "I Shot the Devil" was also covered by the California hardcore punk band Chotto Ghetto on its extended play Shootin' Devils. "I Saw Your Mommy" is featured on the soundtrack to the game Scarface: The World Is Yours for the PlayStation 2, Xbox, and PC. "Institutionalized" is featured in the game Guitar Hero II for the PlayStation 2 and Xbox 360 as a playable song; a member of the most difficult tier, "Face Melters". It was also featured in the film Iron Man (2008) and "Subliminal" was part of the Channel X playlist on Grand Theft Auto V (2013).

== Track listing ==
All tracks are written by Mike Muir, except where noted.

Side one
No.	Title	Writer(s)	Length
1.	"Suicide's an Alternative / You'll Be Sorry"		2:44
2.	"Two Sided Politics"	Muir, Louiche Mayorga	1:03
3.	"I Shot the Devil"		1:51
4.	"Subliminal"		3:08
5.	"Won't Fall in Love Today"	Muir, Mayorga	0:59
6.	"Institutionalized"	Muir, Mayorga	3:49

Side two
No.	Title	Writer(s)	Length
7.	"Memories of Tomorrow"	Muir, Mayorga	0:57
8.	"Possessed"		2:07
9.	"I Saw Your Mommy..."	Muir, Mayorga	4:52
10.	"Fascist Pig"		1:17
11.	"I Want More"	Muir, Mayorga	2:28
12.	"Suicidal Failure"		2:53
Total length:			28:17

== Personnel ==
- Mike Muir – lead vocals
- Grant Estes – guitars
- Louiche Mayorga – bass, backing vocals
- Amery Smith – drums

Production

- Glen E. Friedman – producer, photography
- Randy Burns – engineer
- Dee Zee – artwork
- Mark Stern – lyric sheet typesetting

== Reissues ==
Suicidal Tendencies has been reissued a number of times, with formats in different countries (see the table below).

Year	Country	Format	Label	Note
1983	United States	Cassette	Frontier FCX 011	
1983	United States	Vinyl	Frontier FLP 011	
1987	Europe	Vinyl	Virgin V 2495	Reissue; 33RPM
1987	Europe	CD	Virgin CDV 2495	Reissue
1990	United States	CD	Frontier FCD 011	Reissue
1997	United States	Vinyl	Epitaph 80104-1	Reissue; Remastered
1997	United States	CD	Epitaph 80104-2	Reissue; Remastered
2008	United States	Vinyl (140 gr. Limited edition colored vinyl)	Frontier 31011-8	Remastered (25th Anniversary Edition)
2008	United States	CD	Frontier 31011-9	Remastered (25th Anniversary Edition)

== Notes ==
1. * Guitarist Jon Nelson, who joined the band shortly after the album was completed, is credited in place of Grant Estes on pressings of the album circa 1987, when the album was first released in compact disc-format. Though he does not perform on the album.
