= Dean Pleasants =

American guitarist

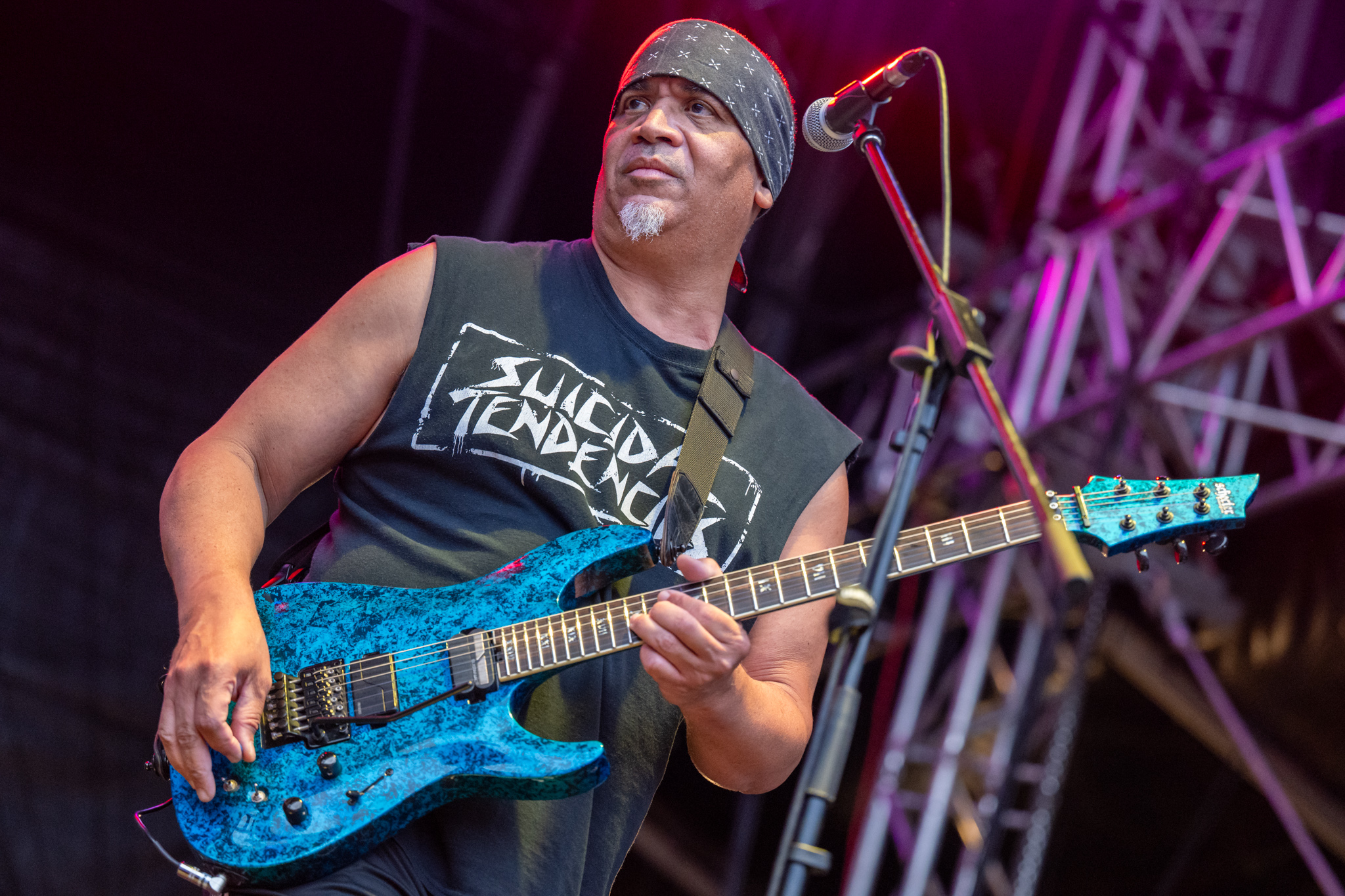
- Pleasants performing in 2024

Background information
- Also known as: Deano
- Born: May 18, 1965 (age 60); San Antonio, Texas, U.S.
- Genres: Heavy metal, punk rock, hardcore punk, crossover thrash, funk metal
- Occupation: Musician
- Instrument: Guitar
- Years active: 1981–present
- Labels: Epic, Suicidal
- Member of: Suicidal Tendencies, Infectious Grooves
- Formerly of: Ugly Kid Joe

Dean Pleasants (born May 18, 1965) is an American guitarist. He has been the lead guitarist for Suicidal Tendencies since 1996, and is their longest-standing lead guitarist, surpassing Rocky George, who had been in the band for 11 years. He is also a member of the Suicidal Tendencies funk metal side project Infectious Grooves. He also played with Ugly Kid Joe on their America's Least Wanted album. He also played with George Clinton, Tone Loc, Coke advertisements, Jessica Simpson, Poe, Jody Watley and Atlantic Starr. Dean currently endorses Schecter guitars, having also used Fernandes and ESP guitars in the past. For amplification he has used VHT, Fender and Marshall amps.
