= Mike Muir =

American singer

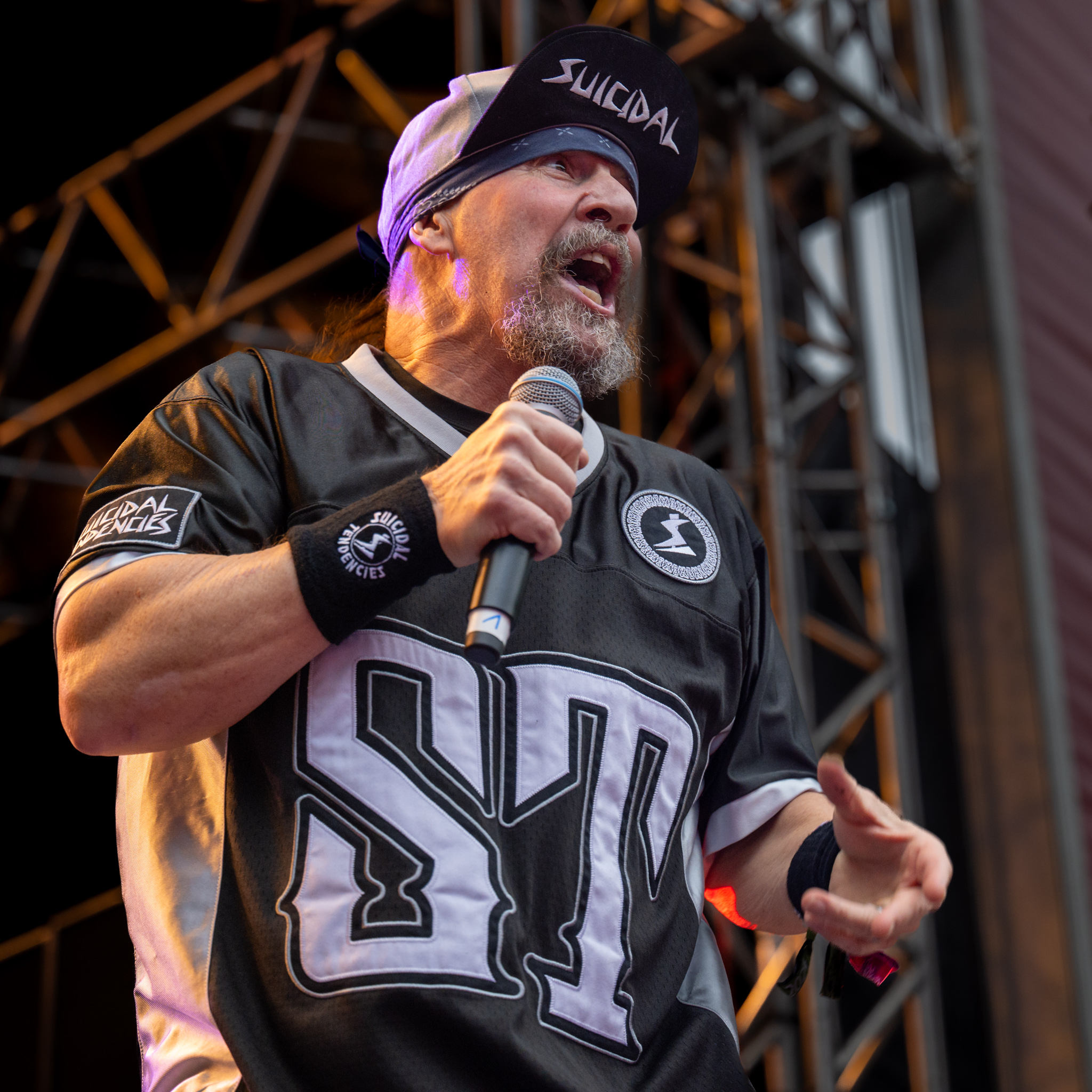
- Muir performing in 2024

Background information
- Also known as: "Cyco Miko"
- Born: Michael Allen Muir; March 14, 1963 (age 63); Venice, Los Angeles, California, U.S.
- Genres: Crossover thrash; hardcore punk; funk metal
- Occupations: Singer; songwriter
- Years active: 1978–present
- Member of: Suicidal Tendencies; Infectious Grooves; Cyco Miko; Los Cycos; No Mercy

Michael Allen Muir (born March 14, 1963) is an American singer who is the lead vocalist and the sole continuous member of Los Angeles-based bands Suicidal Tendencies, Los Cycos, and Infectious Grooves. He has also released several solo albums under his nickname Cyco Miko. Muir's trademark is wearing bandanas, jerseys with the number 13, and hats with block-style letters that read "suicidal".

== Early life ==
Born in Venice, Los Angeles, and raised in Santa Monica, Mike Muir is the younger brother of Jim Muir of the Dogtown skateboarding team. Jim exposed Mike to metal music as well as skateboarding. He also played baseball during his youth. Muir attended Santa Monica College after being kicked out of school in the 10th grade.

== Career ==
Muir has cited bands such as the Sex Pistols, the Ramones, Black Sabbath, UFO, AC/DC, Van Halen, Emerson, Lake & Palmer, Led Zeppelin, and Kiss as his early musical influences, and has said that he was introduced to funk music by former bandmate Robert Trujillo. Muir incorporated funk influences into a few songs by Suicidal Tendencies and into his funk metal side project, Infectious Grooves. He has noted that his older brother had the biggest influence on his taste in music. Metal Hammer wrote that he has one of the "most unique voices in thrash, hardcore and punk."

=== Suicidal Tendencies ===
Muir formed Suicidal Tendencies in 1980 when he was 17 years old. During this time he moved in with his brother and would practice in the kitchen with his friends he stated "we were doing for fun at first and never really thought of it in terms of being a band and what it took." It originally consisted of Muir on vocals, Mike Ball on guitar, Carlos "Egie" Egert on drums, and Mike Dunnigan on bass. There were several lineup changes before Muir hired Grant Estes, Louiche Mayorga and Amery Smith on guitar, bass and drums respectively. In 1983, they released their self-titled album, with success sparked by the anthem song "Institutionalized", which would become one of the first hardcore punk videos to receive substantial airplay on MTV. They have since played tours and festivals worldwide. When No Mercy guitarist Mike Clark was hired as the band's second guitarist in 1987, Suicidal Tendencies began making a change from punk to metal, thus creating what would become crossover thrash, and later began adding funk influences to their music. Robert Trujillo, who was the bassist for Suicidal Tendencies from 1989 to 1995, was responsible for turning Muir on to funk music, and the pair would eventually form Infectious Grooves to play more funk oriented music.

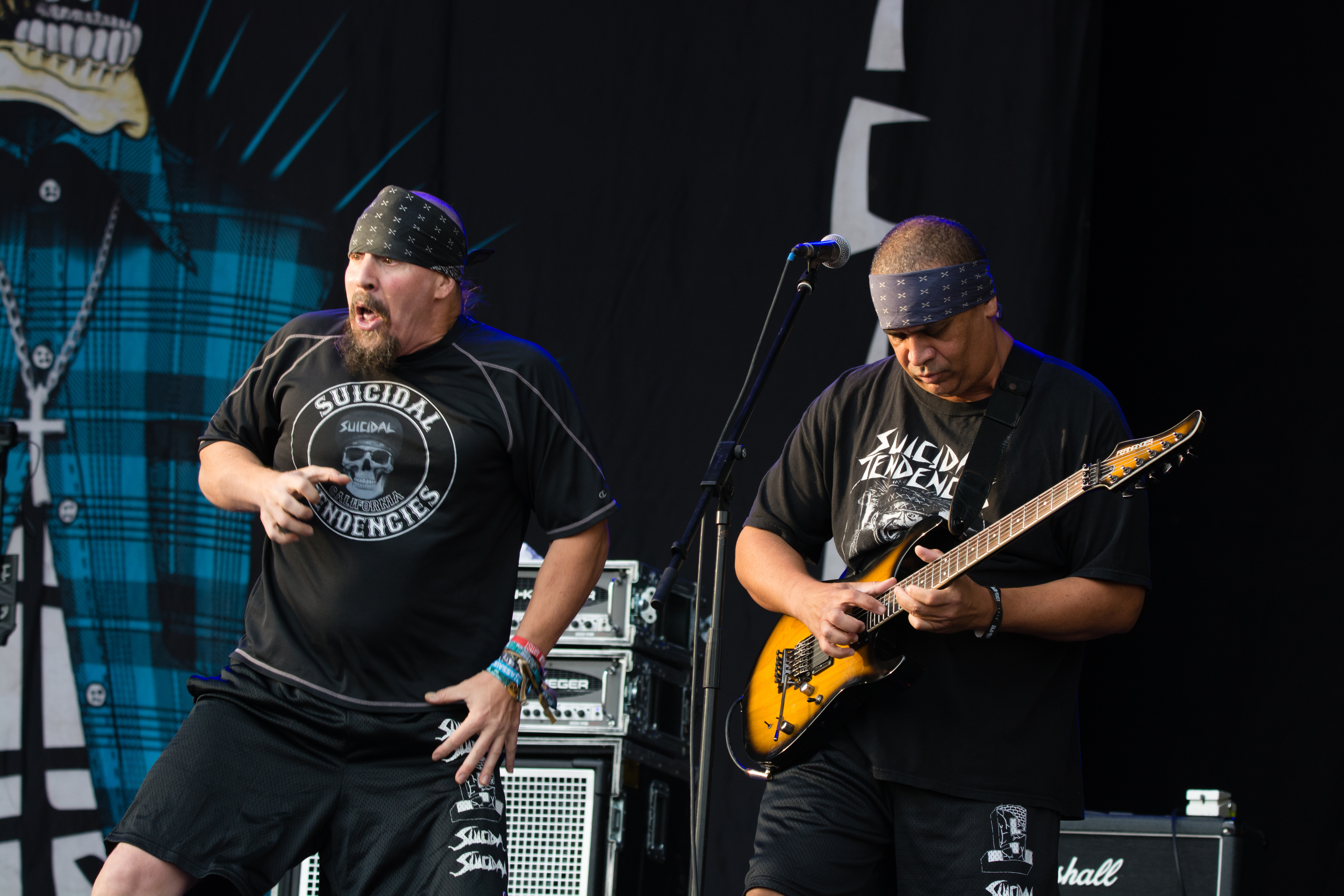
Muir (left) with Suicidal Tendencies in 2018

Cited as one of the most important crossover thrash groups, Suicidal Tendencies was active until 1995, but reunited a year later. Suicidal Tendencies has been touring or playing selected shows almost every year, and until the 2013 release of their ninth studio album 13, they had not released an album containing new music in over a decade. Between the releases of Free Your Soul and Save My Mind and 13, however, the band had debuted new material on stage and through compilation releases on a regular basis. Their most recent album Still Cyco Punk After All These Years was released in 2018.

=== Los Cycos ===
Muir formed Los Cycos in 1984 during Suicidal's first year of their four-year recording hiatus. Current guitarist Jon Nelson left the group and Suicidal Tendencies were banned from playing L.A. shows, largely due to an incident at Perkins Palace where their audience tore out the first 10 rows, making it impossible for promoters to obtain insurance if Suicidal was on the bill. Muir started the label Suicidal Records with bassist Louiche Mayorga. Los Cycos originally consisted of Mike Muir (vocals), Bob Heathcote (bass), Anthony "Bob" Gallo (guitars) and Amery Smith (drums). After a few rehearsals, Amery Smith left the line up, along with bandmate Jon Nelson to start their own band (the Brood). Los Cycos eventually included: Grant Estes on lead guitar, Gallo went to (rhythm), and original choices Bob Heathcote and Amery Smith were replaced by Louiche Mayorga (bass) and No Mercy's Sal Troy (drums). Rehearsals continued in preparation for their debut recording for "Welcome to Venice" on Suicidal Records. With the final line-up established and two songs "It's Not Easy" and "A Little Each Day", Los Cycos was born. "Welcome to Venice" was the first record to be released on Suicidal Records, and the album also included local Venice, Los Angeles bands Suicidal Tendencies, Beowülf, No Mercy, and Excel. Unfortunately the original masters were lost in a fire and no effort has been made to release the material digitally. Mike Muir's vocals can be heard on the Suicidal Tendencies cut "Look Up...(The Boys are Back)" and the Los Cycos track "It's Not Easy". Grant Estes played all guitars on the recordings.

=== Other music projects ===
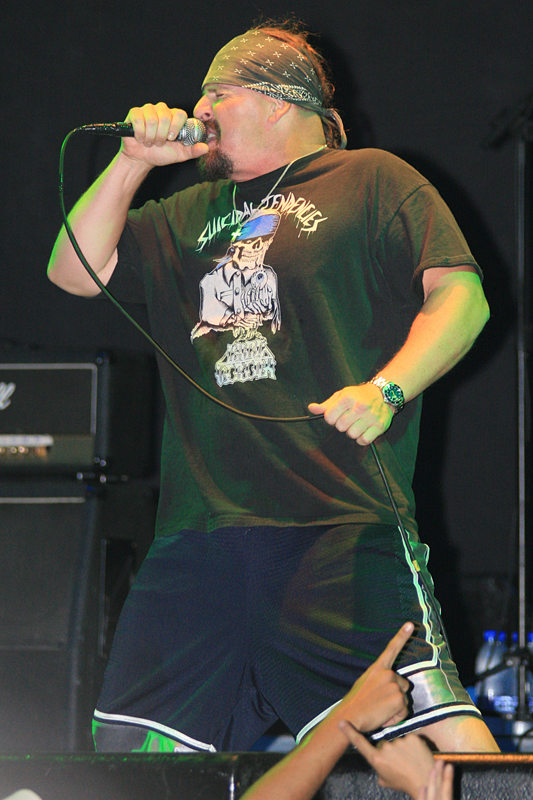
Muir performing in 2008

Muir has released solo albums under his nickname Cyco Miko and has sung for No Mercy, replacing original singer Kevin Guercio, who sang for the band on the Welcome to Venice compilation. Cyco Miko released three albums on the record label Suicidal Records. The album Schizophrenic Born Again Problem Child was released in 2001, following up 1996's Lost My Brain! (Once Again). In October 2011 a third Cyco Miko album was released worldwide, featuring previously unreleased and newly written music from Cyco Miko, Suicidal Tendencies and Infectious Grooves. The album entitled "The Mad Mad Muir Musical Tour - Part 1" featured current Suicidal Tendencies band members as well as performances by Fletcher Dragge, Robert Trujillo, Brooks Wackerman, bassist Thundercat (Stephen Bruner) and saxophonist Kamasi Washington. No Mercy released only one album with Muir, Widespread Bloodshed/Love Runs Red on Suicidal Records.

In 1989, not long after Robert Trujillo joined Suicidal Tendencies, Muir and Trujillo formed Infectious Grooves, a funk metal band that often brought out a goofier type of humor: their albums contain comedy skits by a reptilian lover named Aladdin Sarsippius Sulemenagic Jackson III. To date, the Infectious Grooves have released four albums.

Muir executive produced Excel's 1987 debut album Split Image.

Muir provided vocals on the P.O.D. song "Kaliforn-Eye-A" from their 2008 album When Angels & Serpents Dance.

In May 2021, Muir along with Tim Armstrong (Rancid), Matt Freeman (Rancid), Fletcher Dragge (Pennywise), and Byron McMacken (Pennywise) formed a punk rock supergroup called The Crew. The band's first single, "One Voice", was released on Epitaph Records.

== Personal life ==
Muir is married to an Australian woman and his two sons were born in Australia. His house was made over into a "horror house" on the Discovery Channel show Monster House.

Muir is a co-founder of the S.T. Tattoo Studio in Santa Monica, California.

In 2003 Muir had his first of two back surgeries for a ruptured, herniated disc. The other, in 2005, caused him to cancel Brazilian festival dates and Suicidal shows.

On March 7, 1996, Muir fought Simon Woodstock in a celebrity boxing match on the Action Sports channel. Muir lost to Woodstock.

Muir was a longtime friend to Texan film actor Bill Paxton. The two worked with each other for the LA Times in the late 1970s before Muir formed Suicidal Tendencies and Paxton started his career in Hollywood. Following Paxton's death in 2017, Muir expressed in a tribute his condolences to the late actor on Suicidal Tendencies' Facebook page.

Muir’s brother Jim was inducted into the Skateboarding Hall of Fame in 2014. Muir later joined his brother as a member of the Hall of Fame in 2016, when Suicidal Tendencies was inducted.

=== Views ===
Muir is known for being outspoken on his views about the music industry and society. He has long been an opponent of the Parents Music Resource Center (PMRC), and has reflected this in interviews and a few songs (namely "You Can't Bring Me Down" and "Lovely").

Muir was involved in a near-violent feud with Megadeth frontman Dave Mustaine during the European Clash of the Titans tour, but the two have since reconciled and are apparently now on friendly terms.

Muir has criticized the band (and his band Suicidal Tendencies' former Epic Records labelmate) Rage Against the Machine, who are well known for expressing anti-corporate, left-wing politics in their lyrics. The Infectious Grooves song "Do What I Tell Ya!", from their album Groove Family Cyco, mocks the band. Muir later stated that Rage Against the Machine's guitarist, Tom Morello, provoked the feud by attacking Suicidal Tendencies.

In 2017, Muir reveled that he had never voted stating "I don't like politics. Politics is ugly. I think politics destroys the heart of people. I believe that it's almost like religion in the sense that people are waiting for someone to save them."

Muir has stated he has never used drugs and doesn't drink alcohol.

== Selected discography ==
| Year | Album title | Band | Record label | Credits |
|---|---|---|---|---|
| 1983 | Suicidal Tendencies | Suicidal Tendencies | Frontier | Vocals |
| 1985 | Welcome to Venice | Suicidal Tendencies/Los Cycos | Suicidal Records | Vocals |
| 1987 | Split Image | Excel | Suicidal Records/Caroline | Executive producer |
| 1987 | Widespread Bloodshed Love Runs Red | No Mercy | Suicidal Records | Vocals, producer |
| 1987 | Join the Army | Suicidal Tendencies | Caroline | Vocals |
| 1988 | How Will I Laugh Tomorrow When I Can't Even Smile Today | Suicidal Tendencies | Epic | Vocals |
| 1989 | Controlled by Hatred/Feel Like Shit...Déjà Vu | Suicidal Tendencies | Epic | Vocals |
| 1990 | Lights...Camera...Revolution! | Suicidal Tendencies | Epic | Vocals |
| 1991 | The Plague That Makes Your Booty Move...It's the Infectious Grooves | Infectious Grooves | Epic | Vocals |
| 1992 | The Art of Rebellion | Suicidal Tendencies | Epic | Vocals |
| 1992 | F.N.G. | Suicidal Tendencies | Epic | Vocals |
| 1993 | Sarsippius' Ark | Infectious Grooves | Epic | Vocals |
| 1993 | Still Cyco After All These Years | Suicidal Tendencies | Epic | Vocals |
| 1994 | Groove Family Cyco | Infectious Grooves | Epic | Vocals |
| 1994 | Suicidal for Life | Suicidal Tendencies | Epic | Vocals |
| 1996 | Lost My Brain! (Once Again) | Cyco Miko | Epic | Vocals |
| 1997 | Friends & Family, Vol. 1 | Suicidal Tendencies | Suicidal Records | Vocals |
| 1997 | Prime Cuts | Suicidal Tendencies | Epic | Vocals |
| 1998 | Six the Hard Way | Suicidal Tendencies | Suicidal Records | Vocals |
| 1999 | Freedumb | Suicidal Tendencies | Suicidal Records/SideOneDummy | Vocals |
| 2000 | Mas Borracho | Infectious Grooves | Suicidal Records | Vocals |
| 2000 | Free Your Soul and Save My Mind | Suicidal Tendencies | Suicidal Records | Vocals |
| 2001 | Schizophrenic Born Again Problem Child | Cyco Miko | Suicidal Records | Vocals |
| 2001 | Friends & Family, Vol. 2 | Suicidal Tendencies | Suicidal Records | Vocals |
| 2008 | When Angels & Serpents Dance | P.O.D. | Columbia | Vocals |
| 2008 | Year of the Cycos | Suicidal Tendencies | Suicidal Records | Vocals |
| 2010 | No Mercy Fool!/The Suicidal Family | Suicidal Tendencies | Suicidal Records | Vocals |
| 2011 | The Mad Mad Muir Musical Tour | Cyco Miko | Suicidal Records | Vocals |
| 2013 | 13 | Suicidal Tendencies | Suicidal Records | Vocals |
| 2016 | World Gone Mad | Suicidal Tendencies | Suicidal Records | Vocals |
| 2018 | Still Cyco Punk After All These Years | Suicidal Tendencies | Suicidal Records | Vocals |
