= List of Suicidal Tendencies band members =

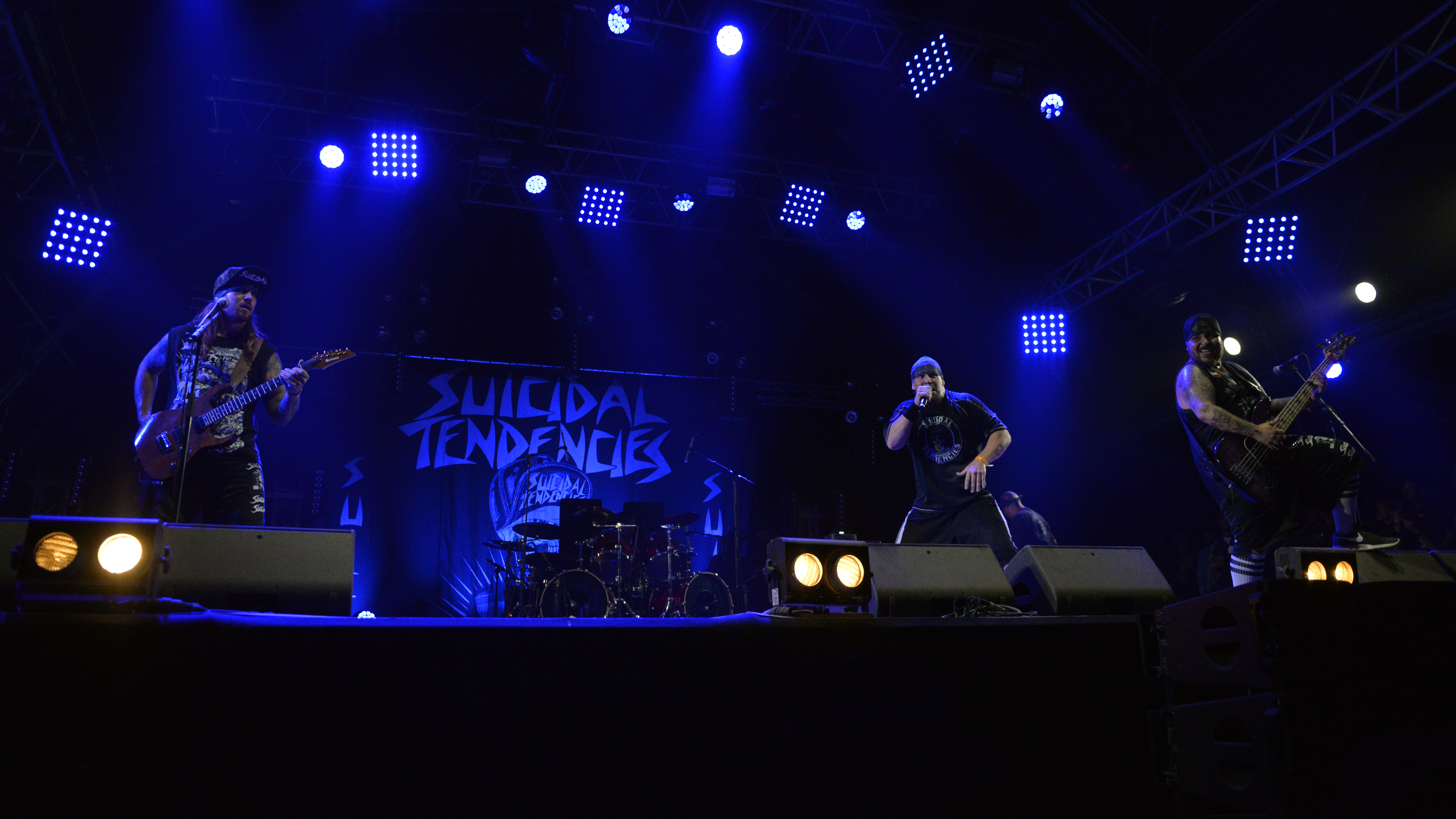
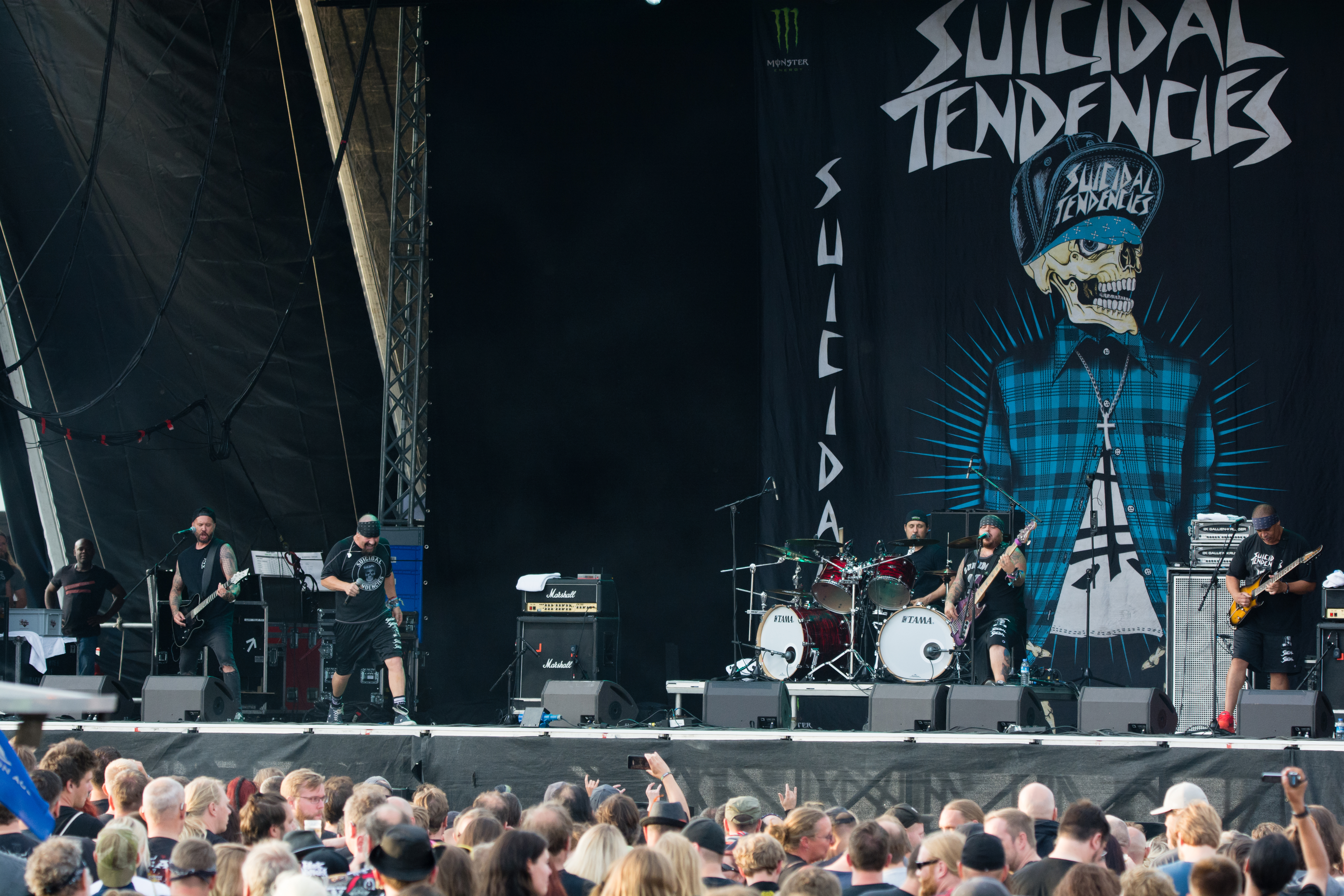
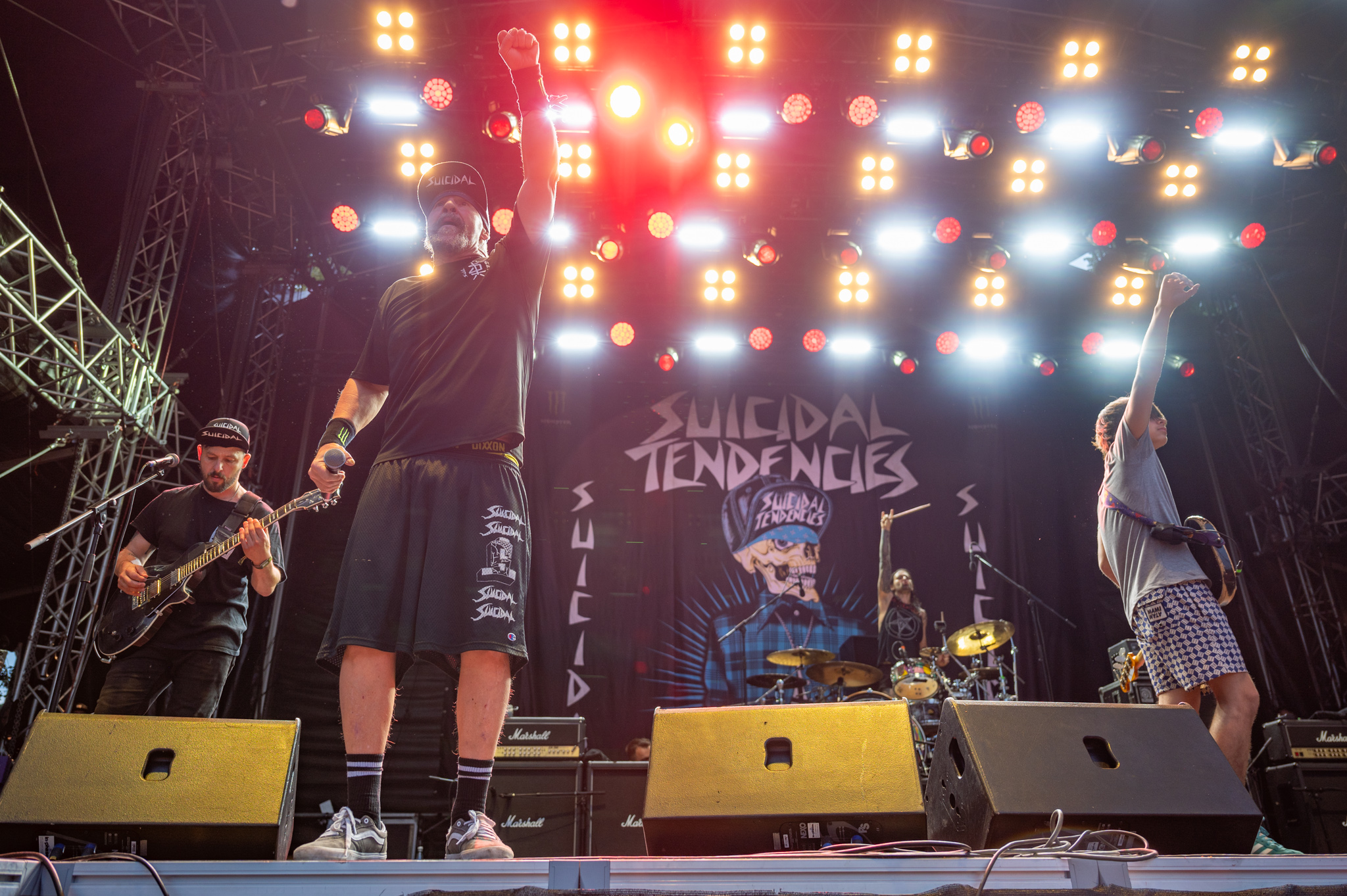
Suicidal Tendencies performing in 2017, 2018 and 2024

Suicidal Tendencies is an American crossover thrash band from Venice, California. Formed in 1980, the group originally featured vocalist Mike Muir, guitarist Mike Ball, bassist Mike Dunnigan, and drummer Carlos "Egie" Egert. Muir is the band's only constant member, the current lineup of which features guitarists Dean Pleasants (since 1996) and Ben Weinman (since 2018) bassist Tye Trujillo (since 2021), and Xavier Ware (since 2026).

== History ==
=== 1980–1995 ===
Mike Muir formed Suicidal Tendencies in 1980 with Mike Ball, Mike Dunnigan and Carlos Egert, the latter of whom left after the band's first demo recording and was replaced by Dunnigan's brother, Sean. By 1982, Mike Dunnigan had switched to guitar and Louiche Mayorga had taken over on bass. This lineup recorded "I Saw Your Mommy" for the 1983 Mystic Records compilation Slamulation, after which the Dunnigan brothers left. They were replaced by drummer Amery "AWOL" Smith and guitarist Rick Battson, briefly, before Grant Estes took over from the latter. After the recording of their self-titled full-length debut, Jon Nelson briefly joined as a second guitarist, before Estes quit just before the start of a tour in the summer and Nelson took over lead guitar.

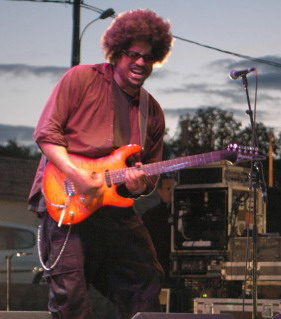
Rocky George joined the band in 1984 and remained a member until their breakup in 1995.

In the summer of 1984, Leonard "Rocky" George took over on guitar; shortly thereafter, Smith was also replaced by Ralph "R. J." Herrera. The band contributed "Look Up... (The Boys Are Back)" to their own label Suicidal's Welcome to Venice compilation in 1985, and released Join the Army in 1987. After the album's promotional touring cycle, Muir brought in rhythm guitarist Mike Clark from recently disbanded No Mercy (of which he was also a member), while Mayorga was replaced by Bob Heathcote from Los Cycos, another of Muir's side projects. After the release and promotion of How Will I Laugh Tomorrow When I Can't Even Smile Today, Heathcote left in February 1989 due to musical differences. Bass on Controlled by Hatred/Feel Like Shit... Déjà Vu was performed by George and Clark.

By the time of a European tour supporting Anthrax in the summer of 1989, Robert Trujillo had taken over bass for Suicidal Tendencies. The new lineup released Lights... Camera... Revolution! in 1990, before Herrera left in late 1991 due to tensions with Muir and his wife being pregnant with their first child. For their next album The Art of Rebellion, the group enlisted Vandals drummer Josh Freese on a session basis. After the album was released, Jimmy DeGrasso took over on drums. In 1993, the band released Still Cyco After All These Years, which featured new versions of songs from their self-titled debut recorded in 1990. The first new album with DeGrasso, Suicidal for Life, followed in June 1994. By late 1995, however, Muir had disbanded Suicidal Tendencies.

=== 1996–present ===
After "about a year" away, Suicidal Tendencies reformed with a new lineup including Infectious Grooves members Dean Pleasants on lead guitar, Josh Paul on bass and Brooks Wackerman on drums, who joined returning members Mike Muir and Mike Clark. This incarnation remained stable for several years, releasing Freedumb, Free Your Soul and Save My Mind, and tracks on several compilations. In early 2001, Wackerman left to pursue other projects and was replaced by Ron Bruner. Around a year later, Paul also left the band, with Bruner's brother Steve "Thundercat" Bruner taking his place. Also in 2002, David Hidalgo Jr. began sharing drum duties with Bruner, with both members performing at various points over the coming years. In October 2008, Eric Moore took over as the band's full-time drummer.

In 2011, Thundercat left Suicidal Tendencies to focus on his solo career. He was replaced by Tim "Rawbiz" Williams. The following June, longtime rhythm guitarist Mike Clark also left to reform No Mercy under the new name Waking the Dead, having previously sat out show due to a head injury. He was replaced by Nico Santora, who completed work on the band's next studio album 13. Shortly after its release, in March 2014 it was announced that former Mars Volta drummer Thomas Pridgen had replaced Moore. In August that year, the band announced that bassist Williams had died. The following month, Pridgen left after just six months with the group to join Chiodos, with Moore returning in his place. Michael Morgan temporarily took over as the band's bassist when they resumed touring in the fall of 2014.

In February 2016, Suicidal Tendencies underwent two more lineup changes – Roberto "Ra" Díaz took over on bass, while former Slayer drummer Dave Lombardo replaced Moore. In May, Santora was replaced by Jeff Pogan, who debuted on World Gone Mad later that year. After the EP Get Your Fight On! and another album, Still Cyco Punk After All These Years, Pogan left and was replaced by former Dillinger Escape Plan guitarist Ben Weinman. During 2021, Díaz and Lombardo were replaced in the band's touring lineup by Tye Trujillo and Brandon Pertzborn, respectively. In April 2023, Pertzborn was replaced by Greyson Nekrutman, who himself made way for former Slipknot drummer Jay Weinberg the following March.

On January 13, 2026, Weinberg announced his departure from the band, his replacement, Xavier Ware, was announced 11 days later.

== Members ==
=== Current ===
| Image | Name | Years active | Instruments | Release contributions |
|---|---|---|---|---|
| | "Cyco" Mike Muir | 1980–1995; 1996–present | lead vocals | all Suicidal Tendencies releases |
| | Dean Pleasants | 1996–present | lead guitar; backing vocals; rhythm guitar (since 2018) | all Suicidal Tendencies releases from Prime Cuts (1997) onwards |
| | Ben Weinman | 2018–present | rhythm and lead guitar; backing vocals | "Adrenaline Addict" (2025) |
| | Tye Trujillo | 2021–present | bass | "Adrenaline Addict" (2025) |
| | Xavier Ware | 2026–present | drums | none |

=== Former ===
| Image | Name | Years active | Instruments | Release contributions |
|---|---|---|---|---|
| | Mike Dunnigan | 1980–1982 (died) | bass (1980–81); lead and rhythm guitars (1981–82) | Untitled 1982 demos; "I Saw Your Mommy" (1983) |
| | Mike Ball | 1980–1981 | lead and rhythm guitars | none |
| | Carlos "Egie" Egert | 1980–1981 | drums | none |
| | Sean Dunnigan | 1981–1982 (died 2002) | drums | Untitled 1982 demos; "I Saw Your Mommy" (1983) |
| | Andrew Evans | 1981–1982 | bass | none |
| | Louiche Mayorga | 1982–1988 | bass; backing vocals | all Suicidal Tendencies releases from the untitled 1982 demos to Join the Army (1987) |
| | Amery "AWOL" Smith | 1982–1984 | drums | Suicidal Tendencies (1983) |
| | Rick Battson | 1982–1983 | lead and rhythm guitars | none |
| | Grant Estes | 1983 | lead and rhythm guitars | Suicidal Tendencies (1983) |
| | Jon Nelson | 1983–1984 | lead and rhythm guitars | none |
| | Leonard "Rocky" George | 1984–1995 | lead and rhythm guitars; bass (1989); backing vocals | all Suicidal Tendencies releases from "Look Up... (The Boys Are Back)" (1985) to Suicidal for Life (1994) |
| | Ralph "R. J." Herrera | 1984–1991 | drums | all Suicidal Tendencies releases from "Look Up... (The Boys Are Back)" (1985) to Lights... Camera... Revolution! (1990); Still Cyco After All These Years (1993) |
| | Mike Clark | 1988–1995; 1996–2012 | rhythm guitar; bass (1989); backing vocals | all Suicidal Tendencies releases from How Will I Laugh Tomorrow When I Can't Even Smile Today (1988) to 13 (2013) – four tracks only |
| | Bob Heathcote | 1988–1989 (died 2022) | bass | How Will I Laugh Tomorrow When I Can't Even Smile Today (1988); Controlled by Hatred/Feel Like Shit... Déjà Vu (1989) – three tracks only |
| | Robert Trujillo | 1989–1995; 2023 (substitute) | bass; backing vocals | all Suicidal Tendencies releases from Lights... Camera... Revolution! (1990) to Suicidal for Life (1994) |
| | Jimmy DeGrasso | 1992–1995 | drums | Suicidal for Life (1994) |
| | Josh Paul | 1996–2002 | bass | all Suicidal Tendencies releases from Prime Cuts (1997) to Friends & Family, Vol. 2 (2001); 13 – one track only |
| | Brooks Wackerman | 1996–2001 | drums | all Suicidal Tendencies releases from Prime Cuts (1997) to Year of the Cycos (2008); No Mercy Fool!/The Suicidal Family (2010) – seven tracks |
| | Ronald Bruner Jr. | 2001–2008 (part-time starting from 2002) | drums | Year of the Cycos (2008) – one track only; No Mercy Fool!/The Suicidal Family (2010); 13 (2013) – three tracks only |
| | Steve "Thundercat" Bruner | 2002–2011 | bass | Year of the Cycos (2008); Live at the Olympic Auditorium (2010); No Mercy Fool!/The Suicidal Family (2010); 13 (2013) |
| | David Hidalgo Jr. | 2002–2008 (part-time) | drums | Live at the Olympic Auditorium (2010); 13 (2013) – one track only |
| | Eric Moore | 2008–2014; 2014–2016 | drums | No Mercy Fool!/The Suicidal Family (2010); 13 (2013) |
| | Tim "Rawbiz" Williams | 2011–2014 (until his death) | bass; backing vocals | 13 (2013) – two tracks only |
| | Nico Santora | 2012–2016 | rhythm guitar; backing vocals | 13 (2013) |
| | Thomas Pridgen | 2014 | drums | none |
| | Michael Morgan | 2014–2016 | bass; backing vocals | none |
| | Ra Díaz | 2016–2021 | bass; backing vocals | World Gone Mad (2016); Get Your Fight On! (2018); Still Cyco Punk After All These Years (2018) |
| | Dave Lombardo | 2016–2021 | drums | World Gone Mad (2016); Get Your Fight On! (2018); Still Cyco Punk After All These Years (2018) |
| | Jeff Pogan | 2016–2018 | rhythm guitar; backing vocals | World Gone Mad (2016); Get Your Fight On! (2018); Still Cyco Punk After All These Years (2018) |
| | Brandon Pertzborn | 2021–2023 | drums | none |
| | Greyson Nekrutman | 2023–2024 | drums | none |
| | Jay Weinberg | 2024–2026 | drums | "Adrenaline Addict" (2025) |

== Lineups ==
| Period | Members | Releases |
|---|---|---|
| 1980–1981 | Mike Muir – vocals; Mike Ball – guitars; Mike Dunnigan – bass; Carlos Egert – drums | none |
| 1981 | Mike Muir – vocals; Mike Ball – guitars; Mike Dunnigan – bass; Sean Dunnigan – drums | none |
| 1981–1982 | Mike Muir – vocals; Mike Dunnigan – guitars; Andrew Evans – bass; Sean Dunnigan – drums | none |
| 1982 | Mike Muir – lead vocals; Mike Dunnigan – guitars; Louiche Mayorga – bass, backing vocals; Sean Dunnigan – drums | Untitled 1982 demos; "I Saw Your Mommy" (1983) |
| Late 1982 – early 1983 | Mike Muir – lead vocals; Rick Battson – guitars; Louiche Mayorga – bass, backing vocals; Amery Smith – drums | none |
| Early 1983 | Mike Muir – lead vocals; Rick Battson – guitars; Grant Estes - guitars; Louiche Mayorga – bass, backing vocals; Amery Smith – drums | none |
| Early – spring 1983 | Mike Muir – lead vocals; Grant Estes – guitars; Louiche Mayorga – bass, backing vocals; Amery Smith – drums | * Suicidal Tendencies (1983) |
| Spring – summer 1983 | Mike Muir – lead vocals; Jon Nelson – rhythm guitar; Louiche Mayorga – bass, backing vocals; Amery Smith – drums; Grant Estes – lead guitar | none |
| Summer 1983 – summer 1984 | Mike Muir – lead vocals; Jon Nelson – guitars; Louiche Mayorga – bass, backing vocals; Amery Smith – drums | none |
| Summer 1984 | Mike Muir – lead vocals; Rocky George – guitars, backing vocals; Louiche Mayorga – bass, backing vocals; Amery Smith – drums | none |
| Fall 1984 – early 1988 | Mike Muir – lead vocals; Rocky George – guitars, backing vocals; Louiche Mayorga – bass, backing vocals; R. J. Herrera – drums | "Look Up... (The Boys Are Back)" (1985); Join the Army (1987) |
| March 1988 – February 1989 | Mike Muir – lead vocals; Rocky George – lead guitar, backing vocals; Mike Clark – rhythm guitar, backing vocals; Bob Heathcote – bass; R. J. Herrera – drums | How Will I Laugh Tomorrow When I Can't Even Smile Today (1988); Controlled by Hatred/Feel Like Shit... Déjà Vu (1989) – three tracks |
| Spring 1989 | Mike Muir – lead vocals; Rocky George – lead guitar, backing vocals, bass; Mike Clark – rhythm guitar, backing vocals, bass; R. J. Herrera – drums | Controlled by Hatred/Feel Like Shit... Déjà Vu (1989) – remaining tracks |
| Summer 1989 – late 1991 | Mike Muir – lead vocals; Rocky George – lead guitar, backing vocals; Mike Clark – rhythm guitar, backing vocals; Robert Trujillo – bass, backing vocals; R. J. Herrera – drums | Lights... Camera... Revolution! (1990); Still Cyco After All These Years (1993) |
| Late 1991 – early 1992 | Mike Muir – lead vocals; Rocky George – lead guitar, backing vocals; Mike Clark – rhythm guitar, backing vocals; Robert Trujillo – bass, backing vocals; Josh Freese – drums (session member) | The Art of Rebellion (1992) |
| Summer 1992 – late 1995 | Mike Muir – lead vocals; Rocky George – lead guitar, backing vocals; Mike Clark – rhythm guitar, backing vocals; Robert Trujillo – bass, backing vocals; Jimmy DeGrasso – drums | Suicidal for Life (1994) |
Band inactive late 1995 – late 1996
| Late 1996 – early 2001 | Mike Muir – lead vocals; Dean Pleasants – lead guitar, backing vocals; Mike Clark – rhythm guitar, backing vocals; Josh Paul – bass; Brooks Wackerman – drums | Prime Cuts (1997) – four new tracks; Friends & Family, Vol. 1 (1997) – three tracks; Six the Hard Way (1998); Freedumb (1999); Free Your Soul and Save My Mind (2000); Friends & Family, Vol. 2 (2001) – five tracks |
| Early 2001 – early 2002 | Mike Muir – lead vocals; Dean Pleasants – lead guitar, backing vocals; Mike Clark – rhythm guitar, backing vocals; Josh Paul – bass; Ronald Bruner Jr. – drums | none |
| Early 2002 – September 2008 | Mike Muir – lead vocals; Dean Pleasants – lead guitar, backing vocals; Mike Clark – rhythm guitar, backing vocals; Thundercat – bass; Ronald Bruner Jr. – drums (part-time); David Hidalgo Jr. – drums (part-time) | Year of the Cycos (2008); Live at the Olympic Auditorium (2010) |
| October 2008 – 2011 | Mike Muir – lead vocals; Dean Pleasants – lead guitar, backing vocals; Mike Clark – rhythm guitar, backing vocals; Thundercat – bass; Eric Moore – drums | No Mercy Fool!/The Suicidal Family (2010) – also features Brooks Wackerman |
| 2011 – June 2012 | Mike Muir – lead vocals; Dean Pleasants – lead guitar, backing vocals; Mike Clark – rhythm guitar, backing vocals; Tim Williams – bass, backing vocals; Eric Moore – drums | none |
| August 2012 – March 2014 | Mike Muir – lead vocals; Dean Pleasants – lead guitar, backing vocals; Nico Santora – rhythm guitar, backing vocals; Tim Williams – bass, backing vocals; Eric Moore – drums | 13 (2013) |
| March – August 2014 | Mike Muir – lead vocals; Dean Pleasants – lead guitar, backing vocals; Nico Santora – rhythm guitar, backing vocals; Tim Williams – bass, backing vocals; Thomas Pridgen – drums | none |
| Fall 2014 – February 2016 | Mike Muir – lead vocals; Dean Pleasants – lead guitar, backing vocals; Nico Santora – rhythm guitar, backing vocals; Michael Morgan – bass, backing vocals; Eric Moore – drums | none |
| February – May 2016 | Mike Muir – lead vocals; Dean Pleasants – lead guitar, backing vocals; Nico Santora – rhythm guitar, backing vocals; Ra Díaz – bass, backing vocals; Dave Lombardo – drums | none |
| May 2016 – July 2018 | Mike Muir – lead vocals; Dean Pleasants – lead guitar, backing vocals; Jeff Pogan – rhythm guitar, backing vocals; Ra Díaz – bass, backing vocals; Dave Lombardo – drums | World Gone Mad (2016); Get Your Fight On! (2018); Still Cyco Punk After All These Years (2018) |
| July 2018 – summer 2021 | Mike Muir – lead vocals; Dean Pleasants – lead and rhythm guitar, backing vocals; Ben Weinman – rhythm and lead guitar, backing vocals; Ra Díaz – bass, backing vocals; Dave Lombardo – drums | none |
| Summer 2021 – April 2023 | Mike Muir – lead vocals; Dean Pleasants – lead and rhythm guitar, backing vocals; Ben Weinman – rhythm and lead guitar, backing vocals; Tye Trujillo – bass; Brandon Pertzborn – drums | none |
| April 2023 – March 2024 | Mike Muir – lead vocals; Dean Pleasants – lead and rhythm guitar, backing vocals; Ben Weinman – rhythm and lead guitar, backing vocals; Tye Trujillo – bass; Greyson Nekrutman – drums | none |
| March 2024 – January 2026 | Mike Muir – lead vocals; Dean Pleasants – lead and rhythm guitar, backing vocals; Ben Weinman – rhythm and lead guitar, backing vocals; Tye Trujillo – bass; Jay Weinberg – drums | Adrenaline Addict (2025) |
| January 2026 – present | Mike Muir – lead vocals; Dean Pleasants – lead and rhythm guitar, backing vocals; Ben Weinman – rhythm and lead guitar, backing vocals; Tye Trujillo – bass; Xavier Ware – drums | none to date |
