= Lights...Camera...Suicidal =

Video by Suicidal Tendencies
- Released: November 20, 1990
- Genre: Funk metal, crossover thrash, thrash metal, hardcore punk
- Label: Sony Music Video Enterprises

Suicidal Tendencies chronology
Lights...Camera...Suicidal (1990)	Live at the Olympic Auditorium (2010)

Lights...Camera...Suicidal is a 1990 home video released by American hardcore punk band Suicidal Tendencies. It was released to accompany their fourth album Lights...Camera...Revolution!, which was released four months earlier, and contains six of the band's music videos, with frontman Mike Muir speaking about each one, and a live video for "War Inside My Head". Lights...Camera...Suicidal is currently out of print, and has never been released on DVD.

With the exception of "Possessed to Skate", all videos on this VHS are from Suicidal Tendencies' tenure on Epic Records, therefore it does not include their debut music video "Institutionalized", or "The Feeling's Back", although the latter was released on the band's Epic debut How Will I Laugh Tomorrow When I Can't Even Smile Today.

== Track listing ==
1. "Possessed to Skate" (from the 1987 album, Join the Army)
2. "Trip at the Brain" (from the 1988 album, How Will I Laugh Tomorrow When I Can't Even Smile Today)
3. "How Will I Laugh Tomorrow" (from the 1988 album, How Will I Laugh Tomorrow When I Can't Even Smile Today)
4. "How Will I Laugh Tomorrow (Heavy Emotion Version)" (from the 1989 album, Controlled by Hatred/Feel Like Shit...Déjà Vu)
5. "Waking the Dead" (from the 1989 album, Controlled by Hatred/Feel Like Shit...Déjà Vu)
6. "You Can't Bring Me Down" (from the 1990 album, Lights...Camera...Revolution!)
7. "War Inside My Head" (live, Join the Army)
8. "Send Me Your Money" (from the 1990 album, Lights...Camera...Revolution!) (appears only on the Japanese version)

== Credits ==
- Mike Muir – vocals
- Rocky George – lead guitar
- Mike Clark – rhythm guitar (all videos except "Possessed to Skate")
- Louiche Mayorga – bass ("Possessed to Skate")
- Bob Heathcote – bass ("Trip at the Brain" and "How Will I Laugh Tomorrow")
- Robert Trujillo – bass (all videos except "Possessed to Skate", "Trip at the Brain" and "How Will I Laugh Tomorrow")
- R.J. Herrera – drums
