= Playlist: The Very Best of Suicidal Tendencies =

Greatest hits album by Suicidal Tendencies
- Released: January 26, 2010
- Recorded: 1988–93
- Genre: Crossover thrash, thrash metal, funk metal
- Length: 67:33
- Label: Legacy
- Producer: Mark Dodson (1988–1993 recordings); Peter Collins (The Art of Rebellion)

Suicidal Tendencies chronology
Year of the Cycos (2008)	Playlist: The Very Best of Suicidal Tendencies (2010)	No Mercy Fool!/The Suicidal Family (2010)

Professional ratings
Review scores
Source	Rating
AllMusic	3.5/5 stars

Playlist: The Very Best of Suicidal Tendencies is a 2010 best-of compilation album released on Sony Legacy, featuring a collection of Suicidal Tendencies' music with the label (as such, material from their first two albums and post-1993 releases are not included).

== Background ==
Playlist was reportedly released without Suicidal Tendencies' involvement (they were no longer associated with Epic Records at the time of its release), so it is unlikely that the compilation is officially recognized by the band themselves. It was also not listed on the discography page from their official website (as of October 2015, the website no longer covers the band's entire discography).

Like the first Suicidal Tendencies compilation album Prime Cuts, Playlist covers only the band's major label years, and omits anything before 1988; two of the songs included on this compilation, "War Inside My Head" and "Institutionalized", are the re-recorded versions from Still Cyco After All These Years. The compilation album also omits anything from the band's 1994 album Suicidal for Life, although it was released on Epic.

The album was released on January 26, 2010 as part of the Playlist music album series issued by Legacy Recordings, simultaneously with similarly unsanctioned best-of collections of the bands and solo artists Mariah Carey, Blue Öyster Cult, Joe Satriani, Steve Vai, 311, R. Kelly, KRS-One and the Backstreet Boys.

== Track listing ==
No.	Title	Writer(s)	Length
1.	"Trip at the Brain" (from How Will I Laugh Tomorrow When I Can't Even Smile Today, 1988)	Mike Clark, Mike Muir	4:31
2.	"How Will I Laugh Tomorrow" (from How Will I Laugh Tomorrow When I Can't Even Smile Today, 1988)	Clark, Muir	6:42
3.	"One Too Many Times" (from How Will I Laugh Tomorrow When I Can't Even Smile Today, 1988)	Clark, Muir	3:12
4.	"Controlled by Hatred" (from Controlled by Hatred/Feel Like Shit...Déjà Vu, 1989)	Clark, Muir	5:38
5.	"You Can't Bring Me Down" (from Lights...Camera...Revolution!, 1990)	Muir, Rocky George	5:48
6.	"Alone" (from Lights...Camera...Revolution!, 1990)	Clark, Muir	4:23
7.	"Get Whacked" (from Lights...Camera...Revolution!, 1990)	Clark, Muir	4:22
8.	"Send Me Your Money" (from Lights...Camera...Revolution!, 1990)	Muir	3:21
9.	"Disco's Out, Murder's In" (from Lights...Camera...Revolution!, 1990)	Clark, Muir, R.J. Herrera	3:06
10.	"Nobody Hears" (from The Art of Rebellion, 1992)	Muir, George	5:32
11.	"I Wasn't Meant to Feel This/Asleep at the Wheel" (from The Art of Rebellion, 1992)	Muir	7:05
12.	"War Inside My Head" (re-recorded version from Still Cyco After All These Years, 1993)	Louiche Mayorga, Muir	3:29
13.	"Waking the Dead" (from Controlled by Hatred/Feel Like Shit...Déjà Vu, 1989)	Clark, Muir	6:54
14.	"Institutionalized" (re-recorded version from Still Cyco After All These Years, 1993)	Muir	3:30
Total length:			67:33
