= No Mercy Fool!/The Suicidal Family =

Studio album of re-recorded songs by Suicidal Tendencies
- Released: September 7, 2010
- Genres: Speed metal, thrash metal, hardcore punk
- Label: Suicidal Records
- Producer: Mike Muir/Paul Northfield

Suicidal Tendencies chronology
Playlist: The Very Best of Suicidal Tendencies (2010)	No Mercy Fool!/The Suicidal Family (2010)	13 (2013)

No Mercy Fool!/The Suicidal Family is the eleventh studio album by American crossover thrash band Suicidal Tendencies, released in 2010. It is considered the follow-up to 1993's Still Cyco After All These Years; like that album, it features some re-recorded songs of their early material. Aside from the re-recordings of songs from their 1987 Join the Army album, it also features re-recordings of No Mercy songs (including the previously released "Something Inside Me" and "No Mercy Fool!"), and the previously released "Come Alive" (from 2008's Year of the Cycos compilation album). Its cover art was created by designer Alan Pirie.

Suicidal Tendencies toured the US, on the "Join The Army / Déjà Vu 2010 US Tour" through October and November, in support of the album.

== Track listing ==
No.	Title	Writer(s)	Original album	Length
1.	"Suicidal Maniac"	Rocky George / Mike Muir	Join the Army	3:10
2.	"Possessed to Skate"	Louiche Mayorga / Muir	Join the Army	3:28
3.	"The Prisoner"	Mayorga / Muir	Join the Army	3:10
4.	"I Feel Your Pain... And I Survive"	George / Muir	Join the Army	3:42
5.	"Join the ST Army"	Mayorga / Muir	Join the Army	4:22
6.	"No Name, No Words"	Mayorga / Muir	Join the Army	2:34
7.	"Born to Be Cyco"	Mayorga / Muir	Join the Army	2:24
8.	"Come Alive"	Muir / Mike Clark	Year of the Cycos	3:43
9.	"Something Inside Me"	Muir / Clark	Friends & Family, Vol. 2	2:59
10.	"No Mercy Fool!"	Muir / Clark	Year of the Cycos	3:28
11.	"We're F'n Evil"	Muir / Clark / Ric Clayton	Widespread Bloodshed Love Runs Red	3:37
12.	"Crazy But Proud"	Muir / Clark / Clayton	Widespread Bloodshed Love Runs Red	3:14
13.	"I'm Your Nightmare"	Muir / Clayton	Widespread Bloodshed Love Runs Red	3:20
14.	"Widespread Bloodshed... Love Runs Red"	Muir / Clayton	Widespread Bloodshed Love Runs Red	4:34

== Credits ==
=== Personnel ===
- Mike Muir – lead vocals
- Dean Pleasants – lead guitar
- Mike Clark – rhythm guitar
- Steve "Thundercat" Bruner – bass
- Eric Moore – drums

=== Additional personnel ===
- Mike Muir, Paul Northfield – production
- Paul Northfield – engineering
- Darian Rundall – recording (drums)
- Brian "Big Bass" Gardner – mastering
- Michael Seiff – artwork (original Suicidal Maniac art)
- Alan Pirie – artwork, design (cd design), layout
- Mathieu Bredeau – photography (band photos)
- Cyco Nation – management
