= Widespread Bloodshed (Love Runs Red) =

Studio album by No Mercy
- Released: 1987
- Genre: Thrash metal
- Length: 41:44
- Label: Suicidal
- Producer: Mike Muir

Professional ratings
Review scores
Source	Rating
Metal.de	7/10

Widespread Bloodshed (Love Runs Red) is the only studio album by American thrash metal band No Mercy, released in 1987 by Suicidal Records. It was re-released in October 2014.

In 1989 "Master of No Mercy", "Controlled by Hatred", "My Own Way of Life", and "Waking the Dead" were re-recorded by Suicidal Tendencies for their Controlled by Hatred/Feel Like Shit...Déjà Vu album, after Mike Clark had joined their band. "We're Evil", "Crazy But Proud", "I'm Your Nightmare", and "Widespread Bloodshed - Love Runs Red" were later re-recorded by Suicidal Tendencies for their No Mercy Fool!/The Suicidal Family album.

== Critical reception ==
BraveWords reviewed the re-issue and wrote: "[...] it’s killer stuff, man, tons of energy and wild thrash/early crossover sounds, with Mike Muir doing his thing on vocals." Metal.de also reviewed the re-issue and said the album is a lot of fun and the band sounds vibrant.

== Track listing ==
1. "We're Evil"
2. "Crazy But Proud"
3. "Master of No Mercy"
4. "Day of the Damned"
5. "Controlled by Hatred"
6. "I'm Your Nightmare"
7. "Widespread Bloodshed - Love Runs Red"
8. "My Own Way of Life"
9. "Waking the Dead"

== Personnel ==
- Mike Muir – vocals
- Mike Clark – guitar
- Ric Clayton – bass
- Sal Troy – drums
- Produced by Mike Muir
