= Trip at the Brain =

Single by Suicidal Tendencies

from the album How Will I Laugh Tomorrow When I Can't Even Smile Today
- B-side: "Suicyco Mania" (instrumental version)
- Released: 1988
- Recorded: April 1988
- Studio: Cherokee, Los Angeles
- Genre: Crossover thrash; thrash metal; hardcore punk
- Length: 4:32
- Label: Epic
- Songwriters: Mike Clark; Mike Muir
- Producers: Mark Dodson; Suicidal Tendencies

Suicidal Tendencies singles chronology
"Possessed to Skate" (1987)	"Trip at the Brain" (1988)	"How Will I Laugh Tomorrow?" (1989)

"Trip at the Brain" is a song by American crossover thrash band Suicidal Tendencies. It is the first track on their 1988 third album How Will I Laugh Tomorrow When I Can't Even Smile Today and was the album's first single. It is also the first track on the 2010 compilation album Playlist: The Very Best of Suicidal Tendencies, which was not endorsed by the band.

== Music video ==
The music video for the song was directed by Bill Fishman, which received heavy rotation on MTV. In the video a homeless person is seen rummaging through some trash. He finds a brain and exclaims "There's nothing wrong with dis brain". Fade to a psychiatrist office where Mike Muir is tied down to a couch while a psychiatrist (same person as the homeless person) tries to hypnotize Muir with a brain on a chain. Muir escapes the office which is part of a psychiatric hospital. Muir opens various doors trying to escape but all only lead to various scenes. These scenes could be interpreted to be scenes in his mind. One scene has John Cusack in a cameo. Muir is recaptured and brought back to the psychiatrist office. The video ends with the opening scene being repeated.

== Covers ==
- This song was covered by the Danish death/thrash metal band Hatesphere in their 2005 EP The Killing.
