= Suicidal Tendencies =

American crossover thrash band

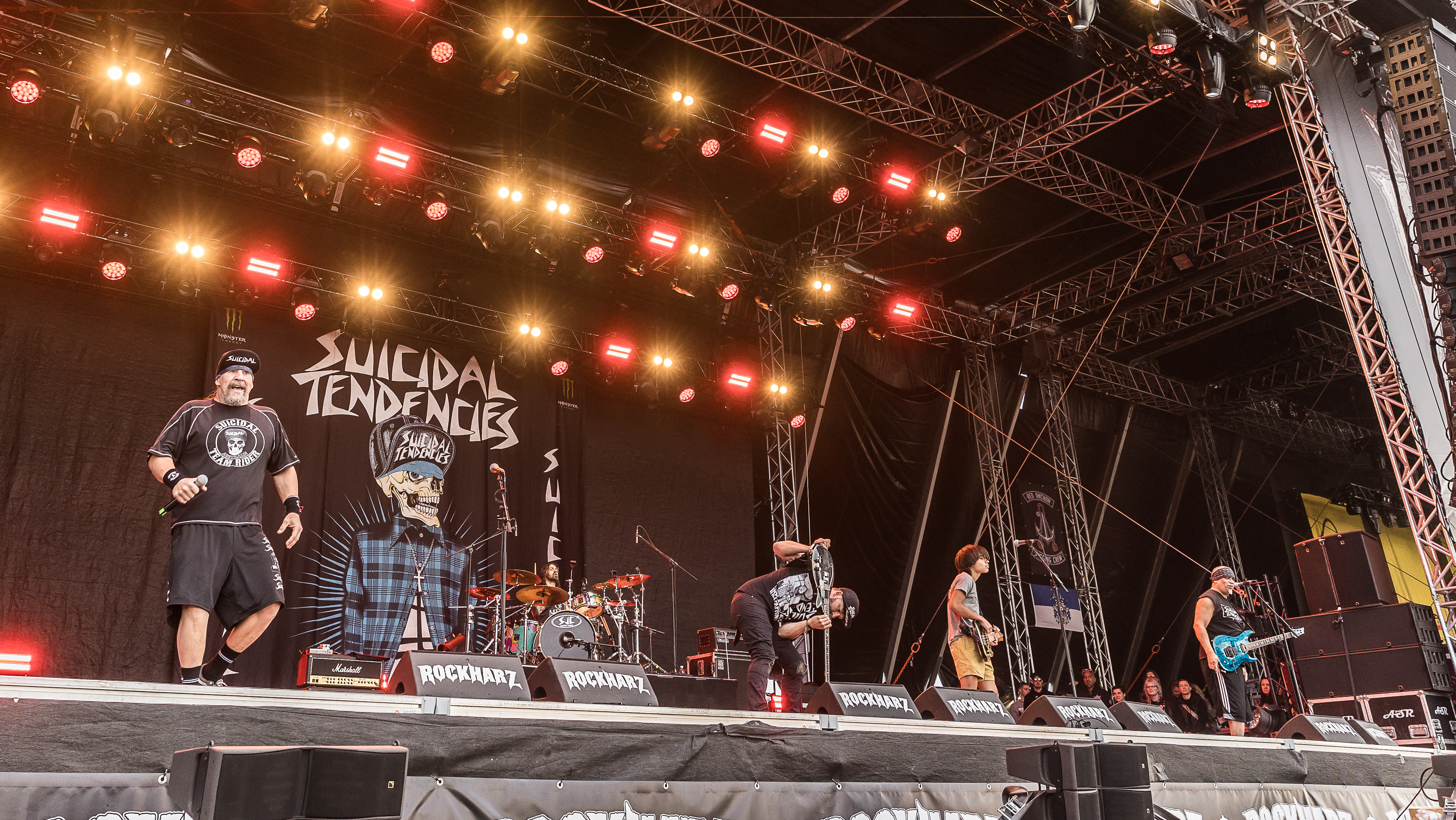
- Suicidal Tendencies performing in Ballenstedt in 2024

Background information
- Also known as: S.T.; SxTx; Suicidal
- Origin: Venice, California, U.S.
- Genres: Crossover thrash; thrash metal; hardcore punk; funk metal; skate punk
- Works: Discography
- Years active: 1980–present
- Labels: Frontier; Caroline; Virgin; Epic; Suicidal
- Spinoffs: Infectious Grooves
- Members: Mike Muir; Dean Pleasants; Ben Weinman; Tye Trujillo; Xavier Ware
- Past members: See list of all band members
- Website: suicidaltendencies.com

Suicidal Tendencies is an American hardcore punk/crossover thrash band, formed in 1980 in Venice, Los Angeles, California, by vocalist Mike Muir. The band has undergone various lineup changes, with Muir as the only constant and sole remaining original member. Their current lineup includes Muir, guitarists Dean Pleasants and Ben Weinman, bassist Tye Trujillo, and drummer Xavier "X" Ware. Notable musicians who have contributed to the band's studio or live activities include Rocky George, Mike Clark, Robert Trujillo, Josh Paul, Stephen "Thundercat" Bruner, Jimmy DeGrasso, Brooks Wackerman, David Hidalgo Jr., Thomas Pridgen, Ron Bruner, Dave Lombardo, Brandon Pertzborn, Greyson Nekrutman, Jay Weinberg, and Josh Freese.

Along with D.R.I., Corrosion of Conformity, and Stormtroopers of Death, Suicidal Tendencies is often credited as one of "the fathers of crossover thrash". They have released fourteen studio albums (four of which are composed of re-recorded or previously released material), two EPs, four split albums, four compilation albums, and two long-form videos. The band achieved its first success with their 1983 self-titled debut album; it spawned the single "Institutionalized", which was one of the first hardcore punk videos to receive substantial airplay on MTV. Suicidal Tendencies' popularity continued to grow exponentially within the next decade, and with their second studio album Join the Army (1987), which was their first to enter the Billboard 200 chart, the band was beginning to experiment with a heavy sound that helped create, develop and popularize the crossover thrash genre.

Suicidal Tendencies' first three albums on the major label Epic Records — How Will I Laugh Tomorrow When I Can't Even Smile Today (1988), Controlled by Hatred/Feel Like Shit... Déjà Vu (1989), and Lights...Camera...Revolution! (1990) — were well-received in the thrash metal and heavy metal communities, with the latter two earning Suicidal Tendencies gold certifications by the RIAA. The band's sixth studio album, The Art of Rebellion (1992), became their greatest chart success, peaking at number 52 on the Billboard 200, and included three of their biggest hits "Asleep at the Wheel", "Nobody Hears" and "I'll Hate You Better". That album, along with its predecessor and its successors Still Cyco After All These Years (1993) and Suicidal for Life (1994), saw the band experiment further, with sounds and influences ranging from thrash metal to progressive and funk music.

Suicidal Tendencies disbanded in 1995 after severing ties from Epic. However, Muir (along with Clark) reformed the band a year later with a new lineup, releasing the albums Freedumb (1999) and Free Your Soul and Save My Mind (2000). Suicidal Tendencies' recorded output was minimal for the remainder of the 2000s, continuing mostly as a live band albeit occasionally performing new songs in concert and releasing them on split albums or compilation albums, including Friends & Family, Vol. 2 (2001) and Year of the Cycos (2008). The band returned to releasing new studio albums in the 2010s, starting with an album of re-recorded material, No Mercy Fool!/The Suicidal Family (2010), followed by two albums with all-new original material: 13 (2013) and World Gone Mad (2016); both albums were well-received by critics, and considered comebacks for Suicidal Tendencies. Their most recent releases are the EP Get Your Fight On! and an album featuring unreleased and re-recorded material, Still Cyco Punk After All These Years, both released in 2018. The band is currently working on new material for their fifteenth studio album.

== History ==
=== Early career and Suicidal Tendencies (1980–1986) ===
Suicidal Tendencies was formed in 1980 as a punk band in Venice, California. The original lineup of the band consisted of Mike Muir on vocals, Mike Ball on guitar, Carlos "Egie" Egert on drums, and Mike Dunnigan on bass. After the recording of their first demo, Carlos Egert left the band and was replaced by Dunnigan's brother, Sean. Muir, at the time a student at Santa Monica College, originally only intended Suicidal Tendencies as a "party band", but as they grew in notoriety he soon found the band at the center of his life. Suicidal Tendencies had a rough start, including being voted "Worst Band/Biggest Assholes" by Flipside in 1982 but the following year were voted "Best New Band". There were many rumors of the band being involved with gangs, and their concerts were known for violence.

In their original lineup photo, which can be seen inside their self-titled debut album, drummer Amery Smith is wearing a flipped up hat and under the bill are the markings "V13", thought to be initials for Venice 13. Smith was not a member of V13 and the hat worn in the photo was borrowed from V13 member Steve Mayorga, brother of Suicidal Tendencies bassist Louiche Mayorga. Eventually another gang sprang up possibly named after the band, the Suicidal Cycos (also known as the Suicidals, Suis or Suicidal Boyz) with chapters in Venice, Long Beach, Santa Monica, Orange County, Oceanside, San Diego, and in San Antonio, Texas.

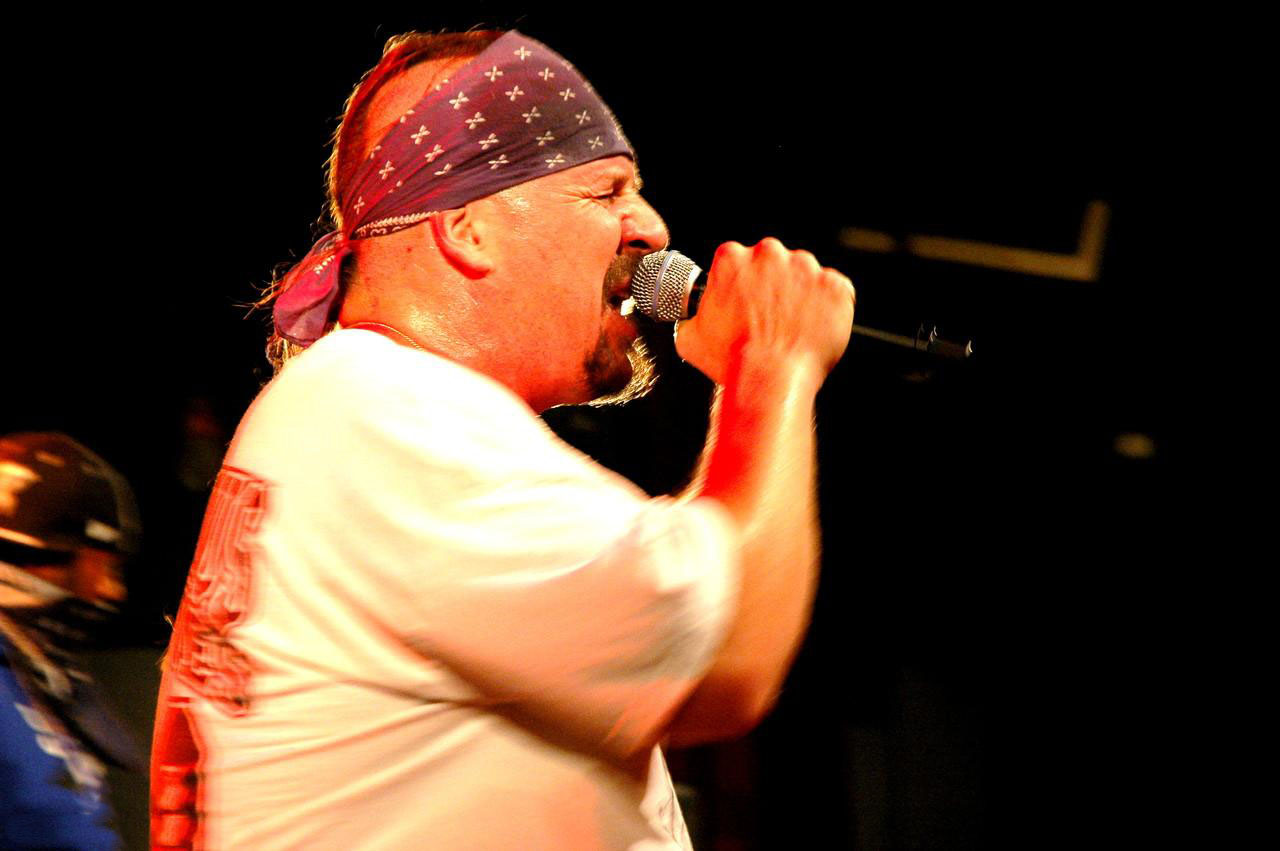
Vocalist Mike Muir formed Suicidal Tendencies in 1980, and is the only remaining original member of the band.

Suicidal Tendencies quickly gained a following and began performing at larger gigs. They recorded a demo in 1982 and were featured on the Slamulation compilation album on Mystic Records. The song featured was "I Saw Your Mommy", which was later featured on their self-titled debut album. The Dunnigan brothers quit after these recordings, with Mike Dunnigan later joining Tony Alva's band the Skoundrelz to be back with Mike Ball on guitar and Bela Horvath on drums. Ball stayed in the band for 2½ years before joining the Skoundrelz and was replaced by Dunnigan. Guitarist Rick Battson recorded the demo before the first album. Grant Estes learned that demo replacing him on guitar and playing on Suicidal Tendencies's first record.

In 1983, Suicidal Tendencies signed with the independent label Frontier Records and released their self-titled debut album. It was described by critic Steve Huey as "Fast, furious, and funny... Mike Muir proves himself an articulate lyricist and commentator, delving into subjects like alienation, depression, and nonconformist politics with intelligence and humor." It contained the song "Institutionalized", which featured a music video that became one of the first hardcore punk videos to receive substantial MTV airplay, and greatly expanded the band's fan base. Prior to creating the "Institutionalized" video, the band appeared on an episode of the MTV program, "The Cutting Edge", which generated some criticism by fans who regarded MTV as too mainstream; criticism to which Muir responded, "I think it was the best thing that's been on MTV! It's a helluva lot better to see Suicidal Tendencies on [MTV] than it is to see Duran Duran." The song "Institutionalized" was later featured in the 1984 film Repo Man, as well as in a 1986 episode of the TV show Miami Vice which also featured a cameo appearance of the group performing in a club. Soon after the release of their debut album in 1983, Estes left the band and was replaced by Jon Nelson.

That same year was the beginning of Suicidal Tendencies's four-year recording hiatus and Mike Muir and bassist Louiche Mayorga formed the label Suicidal Records as well as the band Los Cycos. After some lineup changes the band recorded the song "It's Not Easy" written by Muir. "Welcome to Venice" was the first record to be released on Suicidal Records; the original masters were later destroyed in a fire. In 1989, Suicidal Tendencies re-recorded "It's Not Easy" for their release Controlled By Hatred/Feel Like Shit... DejaVu album. The other Los Cycos track "A Little Each Day" which never made it to the album, was re-recorded for the 1987 Suicidal Tendencies release Join the Army and again on Still Cyco After All These Years released in 1993. In 2000 it resurfaced on the FNG compilation and a fourth time on 2008's (split) album Lights...Camera...Revolution!/Still Cyco After All These Years. The band found a new label in Caroline Records in 1986.

=== New musical direction and new members (1987–1989) ===
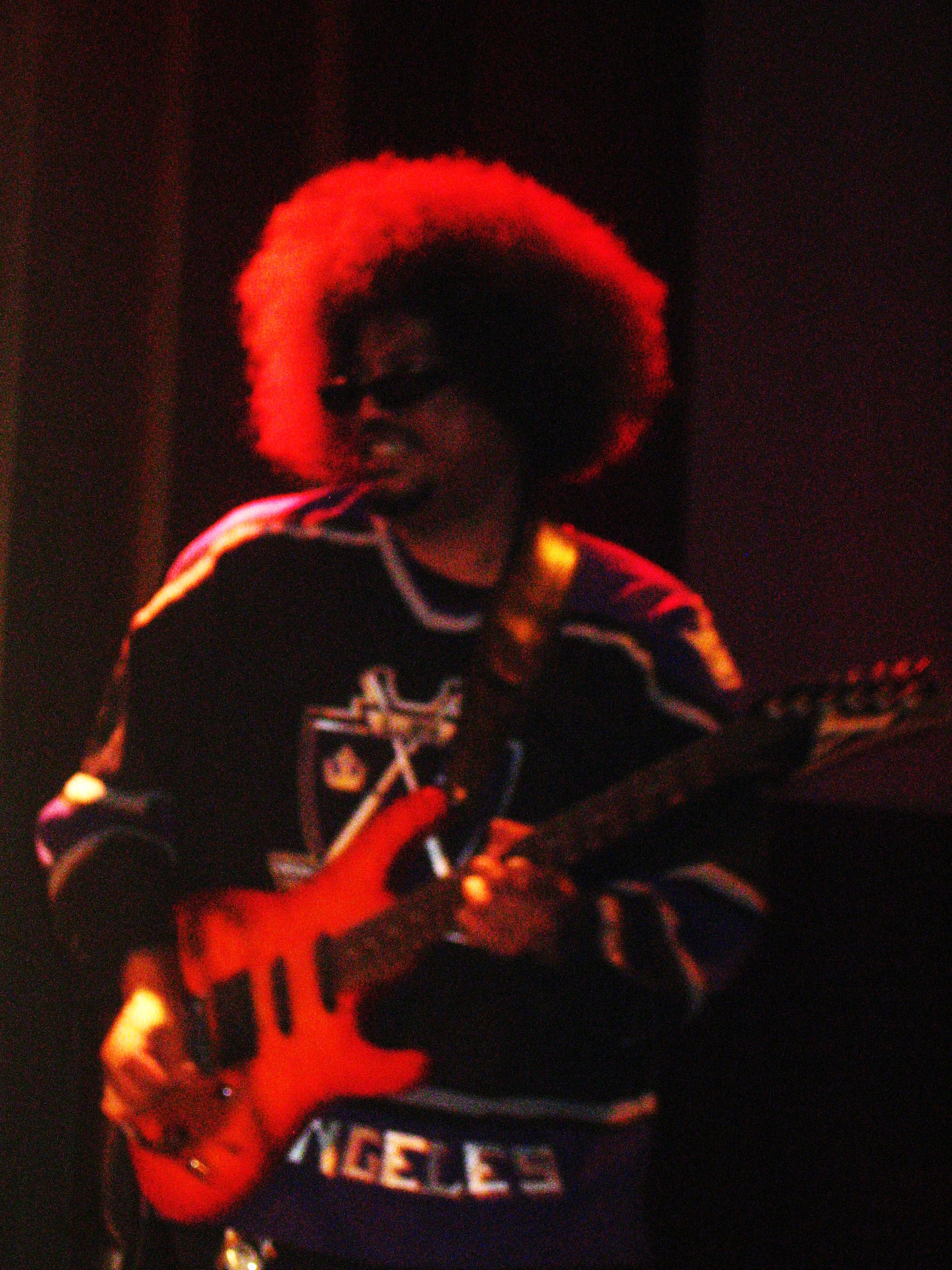
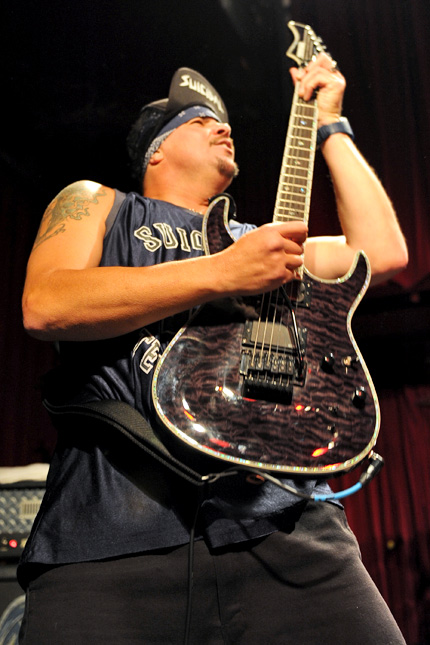
Lead guitarist Rocky George and rhythm guitarist Mike Clark (the latter of whom joined as the band's second guitarist in 1987) are both often credited for changing the musical direction of Suicidal Tendencies from hardcore punk to thrash metal, resulting in the crossover thrash genre.

With the lineup of Muir, Louiche Mayorga, George, and Herrera, the band released their second album, Join the Army, in 1987. The album was met with a mixed reaction from longtime fans due to its considerably more metal-oriented sound (an element brought to the table by Rocky George), as they were expecting another punk album. Nonetheless, Join the Army featured classic tracks such as the title track, "War Inside My Head" and "Possessed to Skate" (which featured a video, originally intended for an unsuccessful skateboard movie, which featured Timothy Leary).

Shortly afterwards, the band made some major changes. George's metal influences (reflected in his Motörhead-esque songwriting contributions to Join the Army) began in turn influencing Muir, who replaced Keven Guercio as singer for Mike Clark's speed metal band No Mercy prior to this. Muir hired Clark as a rhythm guitarist for Suicidal. Clark helped handle much of the band's songwriting, which progressed into a more thrash-oriented musical direction. He fired Mayorga, who had been trying to keep the band in punk territory, and was replaced briefly by No Mercy bassist Ric Clayton, who was replaced by Bob Heathcote. Shortly after the band was picked up by Anthrax producer Mark Dodson and signed to the Columbia subsidiary Epic Records.

The band's first release with Epic was How Will I Laugh Tomorrow When I Can't Even Smile Today, released in 1988. The album was mostly stripped of the band's punk and hardcore roots, instead featuring a thrash-oriented sound with more complex song structures and a greater emphasis on instrumental skill than the band had ever shown previously. However, the album was considerably more melodic than most thrash metal albums, perhaps a lasting influence of the band's punk past. Singles and music videos were released for "Trip at the Brain" and the title track, which were successful and helped expand the bands audience. That same year the band was thanked by country musician Hank Williams Jr. at the 1988 CMA Awards; Williams' son was apparently a fan of Suicidal Tendencies.

In early 1989, Heathcote (who at the time was a father of one child) left the band to support his family and was replaced by Robert Trujillo, who joined Suicidal Tendencies right before their summer European tour with Anthrax. Later that year, Suicidal Tendencies released their fourth album (also referred to as a compilation of two EPs), Controlled By Hatred/Feel Like Shit...Déjà Vu. Although Trujillo appeared in the videos that promoted the album, he was not a member of the band at the time of its recording; bass duties were reportedly handled by Rocky George and Mike Clark. Controlled by Hatred... featured two versions of "How Will I Laugh Tomorrow": the video version (the original song cut down for radio/video airplay) and the "heavy emotion" version (a semi-unplugged, more mellow version of the song). In addition to those two versions of "How Will I Laugh Tomorrow", as well as two new original cuts ("Just Another Love Song" and "Feel Like Shit...Deja Vu"), the album includes four covers of No Mercy songs ("Master of No Mercy", "Waking the Dead", "Controlled by Hatred" and "Choosing My Own Way of Life") and a cover version of Los Cycos' only-known existing track "It's Not Easy". The album featured the hit "Waking the Dead", which at seven minutes was one of the most progressive tracks the band had released to date, and had a music video that received considerable airplay by Headbangers Ball on MTV. Controlled By Hatred... eventually went gold, the first of only two Suicidal albums to do so.

=== Height of popularity and funk-oriented era (1990–1993) ===
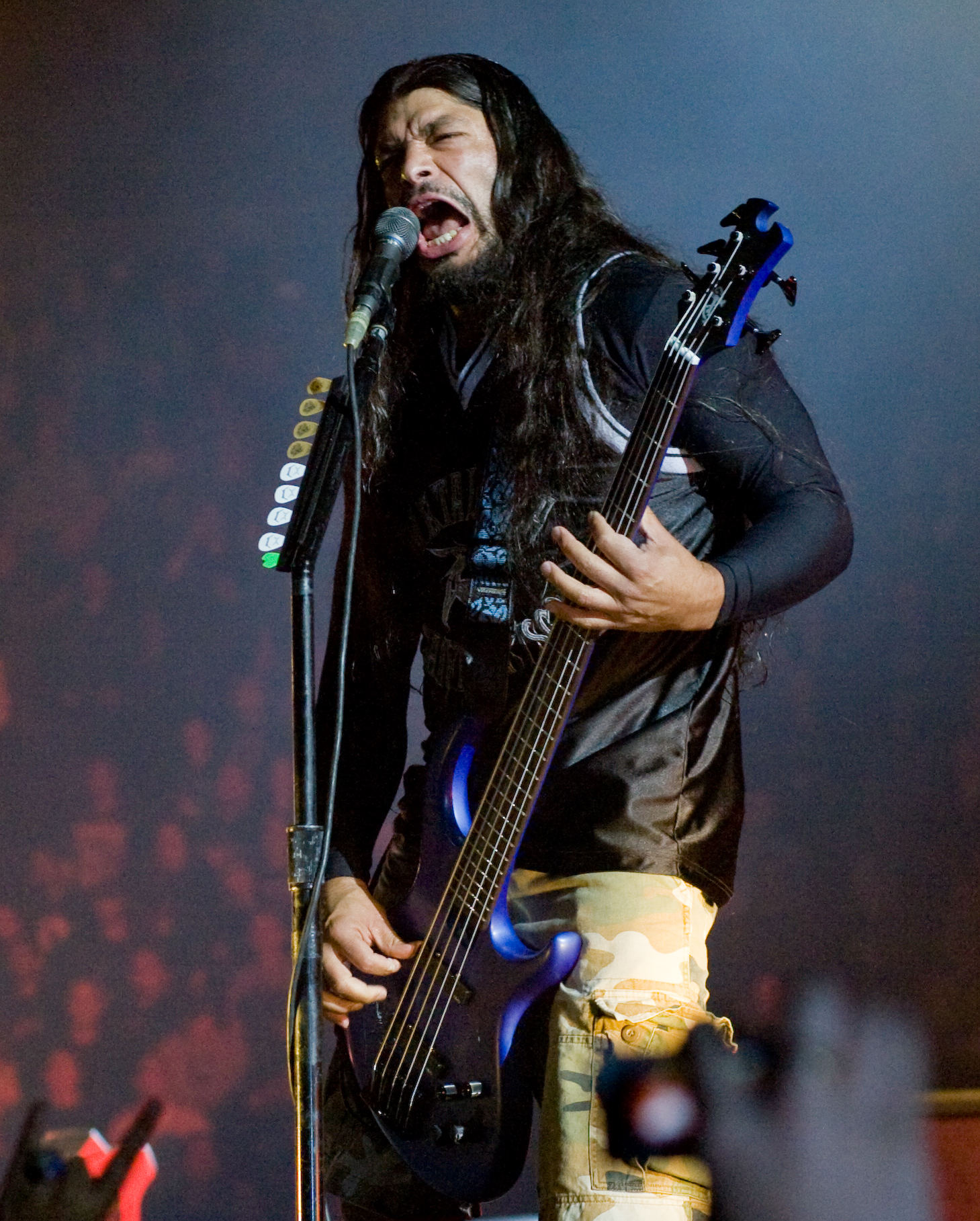
Robert Trujillo, who was the bassist for Suicidal Tendencies from 1989 to 1995, was responsible for adding funk influences to the band's musical direction.

In 1990, Suicidal Tendencies released the album that many fans consider to be their masterpiece, and the album that almost broke them into the rock mainstream, Lights...Camera...Revolution!. This album featured the same line-up as Controlled By Hatred..., with Trujillo on bass guitar. The songs were much more complex than on any other Suicidal album, some songs bordering on progressive metal, but also showed a new influence courtesy of Trujillo, funk. To accompany the album, Suicidal Tendencies released the home video Lights...Camera...Suicidal. The album was a hit, and featured the singles "You Can't Bring Me Down", "Send Me Your Money", and the melodic thrash song "Alone". All three singles were successful and its music videos (especially for "You Can't Bring Me Down") became staples on MTV's Headbangers Ball; this new-found popularity helped Suicidal Tendencies gain a wider audience in the heavy metal community, despite being commonly accused of "selling out" in the hardcore circle, and eventually resulted in Lights...Camera...Revolution! reaching gold status and being nominated for a Grammy award (losing to Metallica). The success of the album also led to the band's first show in Los Angeles in years, in addition to headlining major U.S. tours (with a variety of acts such as Pantera, Exodus, Armored Saint, Jane's Addiction, 24-7 Spyz, White Zombie and Leeway), their appearance on the European Clash of the Titans tour (with Megadeth, Slayer and Testament) and supporting Queensrÿche on their Empire tour.

Muir eventually became interested in the funk music that Trujillo had brought to the table of Suicidal Tendencies' influences. As a result, the two formed a funk metal side project in the vein of early Red Hot Chili Peppers called Infectious Grooves. Also recruiting Jane's Addiction drummer Stephen Perkins and Excel guitarist Adam Siegel, Infectious Grooves released their debut, The Plague That Makes Your Booty Move...It's the Infectious Grooves, which featured Ozzy Osbourne singing the line "therapy" in the song "Therapy" in 1991. This helped expand Suicidal Tendencies' fan base into a wider audience that included members of the alternative rock community (funk metal was a popular alternative metal style at the time).

Herrera left Suicidal Tendencies in 1991 due to personal differences. The rest of the band continued as an incomplete four-piece for about a year, drafting now-famous drummer Josh Freese to record their new album which would become The Art of Rebellion, released in 1992. The album was very different from anything Suicidal Tendencies had done before, but it was actually their most melodic, accessible album to date. It lessened the bands thrash influences, instead focusing on a unique, almost alternative metal sound, with more emphasis on funk and progressive rock, as well as traditional metal guitars. Despite the experimentation, and the fact that it was released at a time when grunge became more successful than hard rock and heavy metal, The Art of Rebellion was greeted warmly by most fans and many critics, and garnered Suicidal Tendencies their highest chart position to date on the Billboard 200 (reaching at number 52), and producing three hits: "Asleep at the Wheel", "Nobody Hears" and "I'll Hate You Better", all of which were successful on the Billboard singles charts. During the accompanying tour for The Art of Rebellion, the band had performed at mostly arenas and stadiums worldwide, sharing the stage with such mainstream rock staples as Metallica, Megadeth, Kiss, Guns N' Roses, Queensrÿche, Danzig, Alice in Chains, Faith No More and White Zombie, where they earned a wide reputation as an excellent live act. Also during this period, Suicidal Tendencies had found a permanent replacement for Herrera, former White Lion and Y&T drummer Jimmy DeGrasso.

Now at their commercial peak, Suicidal Tendencies released Still Cyco After All These Years in 1993. The album was a re-recording of Suicidal Tendencies's self-titled debut album with three additional songs (two re-recordings of Join the Army tracks, and the B-side to the 1990 single "Send Me Your Money"). It featured singles for the re-recorded versions of "Institutionalized" and "I Saw Your Mommy", which managed to do well, as did the album. That same year also saw the release of another Infectious Grooves album, Sarsippius' Ark, which included new tracks as well as demo recordings of old songs, and live tracks.

=== Suicidal for Life, disbandment and reunion (1994–2001) ===
Disturbed by their recent commercial success and fame, and fear that the band was no longer relevant in the underground, Suicidal Tendencies released Suicidal for Life in 1994. The album was intended by the band to be the least accessible album they had released, starting out by having four consecutive songs with the word "fuck" in the title, and switching to a more aggressive style than on their previous studio album. Suicidal for Life was widely considered to be a disappointing album by critics, many of which claimed Muir had "dumbed down" his lyrical approach from previous albums. Fans also had a generally mixed reaction, although their reaction was more favorable than critics'.

Muir's strategy worked, however. Despite obtaining the band's second-highest chart position on the Billboard 200 at number 82, the album did not sell nearly as well as the past few Suicidal Tendencies records (although it did sell decently on the band's reputation alone) and one of its singles, "Love Vs. Loneliness", featured a gloomy music video that hurt the song's airplay. One of the other singles, "What You Need's a Friend", did however receive good rotation on album-oriented radio stations, the most notable being KNAC.

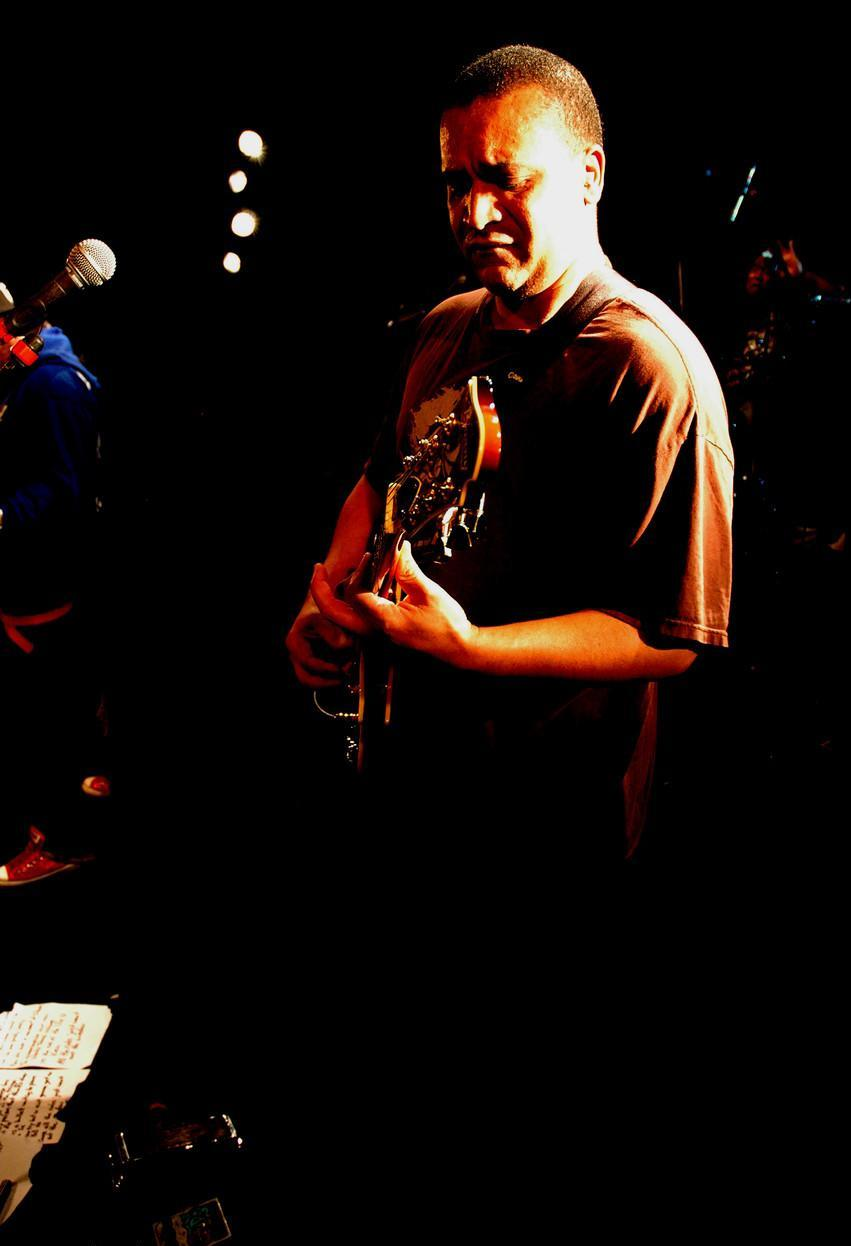
Suicidal Tendencies' current lead guitarist Dean Pleasants. He replaced Rocky George in 1996 when the band reformed a year after their breakup.

It was also around this time the band, whose contract with Epic Records had expired, began to fall apart, and folded after a tour in 1995. Muir and Trujillo continued Infectious Grooves, releasing Groove Family Cyco later that year (this album was released before Suicidal Tendencies split), but they eventually folded as well, with Trujillo joining Ozzy Osbourne's band (and later Black Label Society and Metallica) and Muir performing as Cyco Miko, releasing Lost My Brain! (Once Again). Rocky George formed the group Samsara and played in 40 Cycle Hum and Cro-Mags after Suicidal Tendencies's breakup, eventually joining Fishbone. Mike Clark joined a band called Creeper, while Jimmy DeGrasso returned to Y&T while joining Dave Mustaine's side project MD.45, and eventually replaced Nick Menza in Megadeth, who recruited guitarist Anthony Gallo (Suicidal Tendencies, Los Cycos) for his solo record entitled Life After Deth.

Around 1996, Suicidal Tendencies had reunited, with Muir and Clark hiring lead guitarist Dean Pleasants (formerly of Infectious Grooves), new bassist Josh Paul and new drummer Brooks Wackerman (formerly of Bad4Good and Infectious Grooves, who later joined Bad Religion and is now with Avenged Sevenfold) as the respective replacements of George, Trujillo, and DeGrasso. Coinciding with the reunion, a greatest hits compilation, Prime Cuts, was released in 1997 by their former record company, apparently against the band's will.

The band released their first new material in almost half a decade, the Six the Hard Way EP in 1998, which also included two live tracks. Released on Suicidal Records, this EP saw the band switching back to their original punk metal and skatepunk style (with songs originally recorded by Cyco Miko covered). This, along with the absence of George and Trujillo, upset many of the bands metal-era fans, but fans of the older punk Suicidal Tendencies warmly welcomed the new style.

The band stuck to a similar formula for Freedumb, released in 1999. Despite generally bad reviews from critics (who claimed that the band had "dumbed themselves down" not only lyrically, but musically as well) it was considered by fans of the band as their "comeback album", with the title track, "Cyco Vision" and "We Are A Family" becoming fan favorites (although no singles from the album were released).

The following year Suicidal Tendencies released Free Your Soul and Save My Mind. Unlike its predecessor, which was more straightforward hardcore, this album saw the band covering most of the styles they had dabbled with in the past. Some songs were punk, but many of them were also thrash-oriented, and this was by far Suicidal Tendencies's funkiest album yet. Fans and critics greeted the album warmly, and a new single, "Pop Song", was released.

Infectious Grooves released their fourth and comeback album Mas Borracho in 2000, followed by Muir's second solo album as Cyco Miko, Schizophrenic Born Again Problem Child, in 2001.

Suicidal Tendencies featured a new song on the Friends & Family, Vol. 2 compilation in 2001; after then, the band fell silent again.

=== Years of touring and lineup changes (2001–2012) ===
Wackerman (who had just joined Bad Religion) had left Suicidal Tendencies by 2001 while the band was on tour. Greg Saenz joined the band before Ron Bruner took over drum duties, and Josh Paul also left the following year but was replaced by Ron Bruner's brother Steve. The band toured during 2003, but were forced take another hiatus in 2004 due to Mike Muir requiring surgery for a back injury.

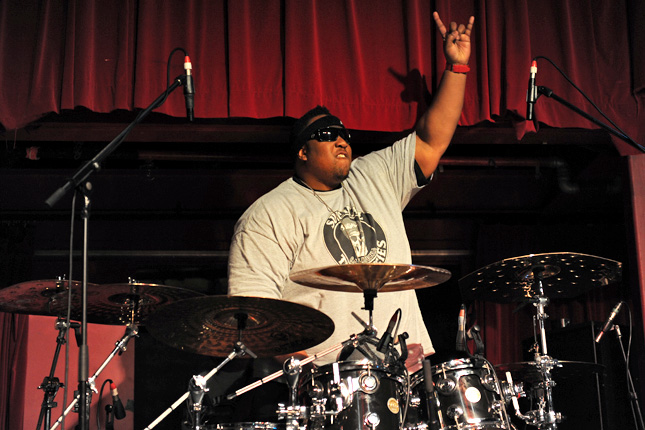
Eric Moore was the drummer for Suicidal Tendencies between 2008 and 2015.

While the band failed to release an album with material, independently or otherwise, Suicidal Tendencies have continued to tour consistently since 2005. On October 29 of that year their live performance at the Grand Olympic Auditorium in Los Angeles was filmed. Suicidal Tendencies secured a spot in the metal/punk rock Soundwave Festival in Australia in February and March 2007, taking in Brisbane, Sydney and Perth. They performed at the Artefact Festival in France on April 29, 2007, and performed in Istanbul, Turkey on May 29. They also headlined the Tuborg Stage at the Download Festival, held at Donington Park, UK, on Friday June 8, 2007, and closed select shows for the Sounds of the Underground tour in San Jose, California, on August 3, Irvine, California, on August 4, and Mesa, Arizona, on August 5. On August 1, 2008, Suicidal Tendencies headlined the Porão do Rock Festival in Brasília in front of 15,000 people. By this stage Eric Moore had replaced Dave Hidalgo on drums. During the fall of 2008, the band toured with Madball, Terror, and Death by Stereo, opening select dates. During this tour Year of the Cycos – a compilation album featuring Suicidal Tendencies, Infectious Grooves, Cyco Miko and No Mercy – was available for the first time for purchase at the concerts or from their official website. From the album, the original track "Come Alive" was released as a video clip. The band replaced As I Lay Dying on the first five shows of the No Fear Energy Music Tour with Lamb of God. Suicidal Tendencies toured Europe from June through July 2009.

The first Suicidal Tendencies DVD Live at the Olympic Auditorium, featuring the full show recorded in Los Angeles back in 2005, was released on January 26, 2010, by Fontana Distribution via the band's own imprint, Suicidal Records. On the same day, a best of compilation was released as part of the Playlist music album series issued by Sony BMG.

In September 2010, Suicidal Tendencies released the album No Mercy Fool!/The Suicidal Family which consists of re-recordings of tracks from the Join the Army album and of old No Mercy songs, plus the previously released "Come Alive".

=== 13 and World Gone Mad (2013–2017) ===
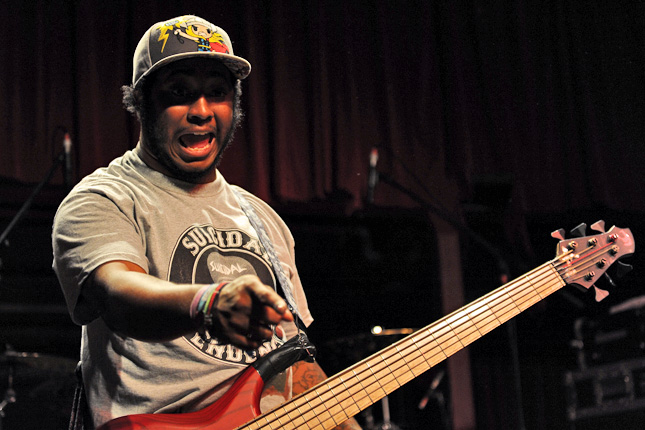
Stephen "Thundercat" Bruner was the bassist for Suicidal Tendencies from 2002 to 2011, although he did perform on their eleventh studio album 13, which was released two years after his departure from the band.

Suicidal Tendencies released 13, their first album with new material in 13 years, on March 26, 2013. The band spent the next few years touring in support of the album, with such bands as D.R.I., Sick of It All, Slayer, Exodus, Slipknot, Beartooth, Megadeth, Children of Bodom and Havok. They also headlined the 2014 Persistence Tour, and appeared at many festivals such as Riot Fest in 2013, Amnesia Rockfest in 2014 and Motörhead's Motörboat cruise and Knotfest in both 2015.

On March 11, 2014, Thomas Pridgen (former drummer of the Mars Volta) confirmed on his Instagram and Facebook page that he had joined Suicidal Tendencies. By the fall of 2014, Pridgen was no longer playing in Suicidal Tendencies, and Eric Moore rejoined the band.

On August 27, 2014, Suicidal Tendencies announced that bassist Tim Williams had died. Rawbiz was replaced by Michael Morgan, and two years later by Ra Díaz.

In a December 2014 interview with Loudwire, vocalist Mike Muir was asked if Suicidal Tendencies would release a follow-up to 13. He replied, "Right now I have no answer to that as far as the previous one. There were a lot of things that went on and I think for us now, if everyone said they wanted to get into the studio and there was something they really wanted to do, I'd take it into consideration. But we're in the studio all the time, we're always recording." In an April 2015 interview with Metalhead Blog, guitarist Dean Pleasants revealed that Suicidal Tendencies had been working on new material for a possible compilation album.

In a February 2016 interview, Muir hinted at a new EP, followed by a new full-length studio album, inspired by the then-current political climate and upcoming election. He also stated that the album and EP could be the band's final recordings, although he added, "I thought the first one would probably be the last we would do, too."

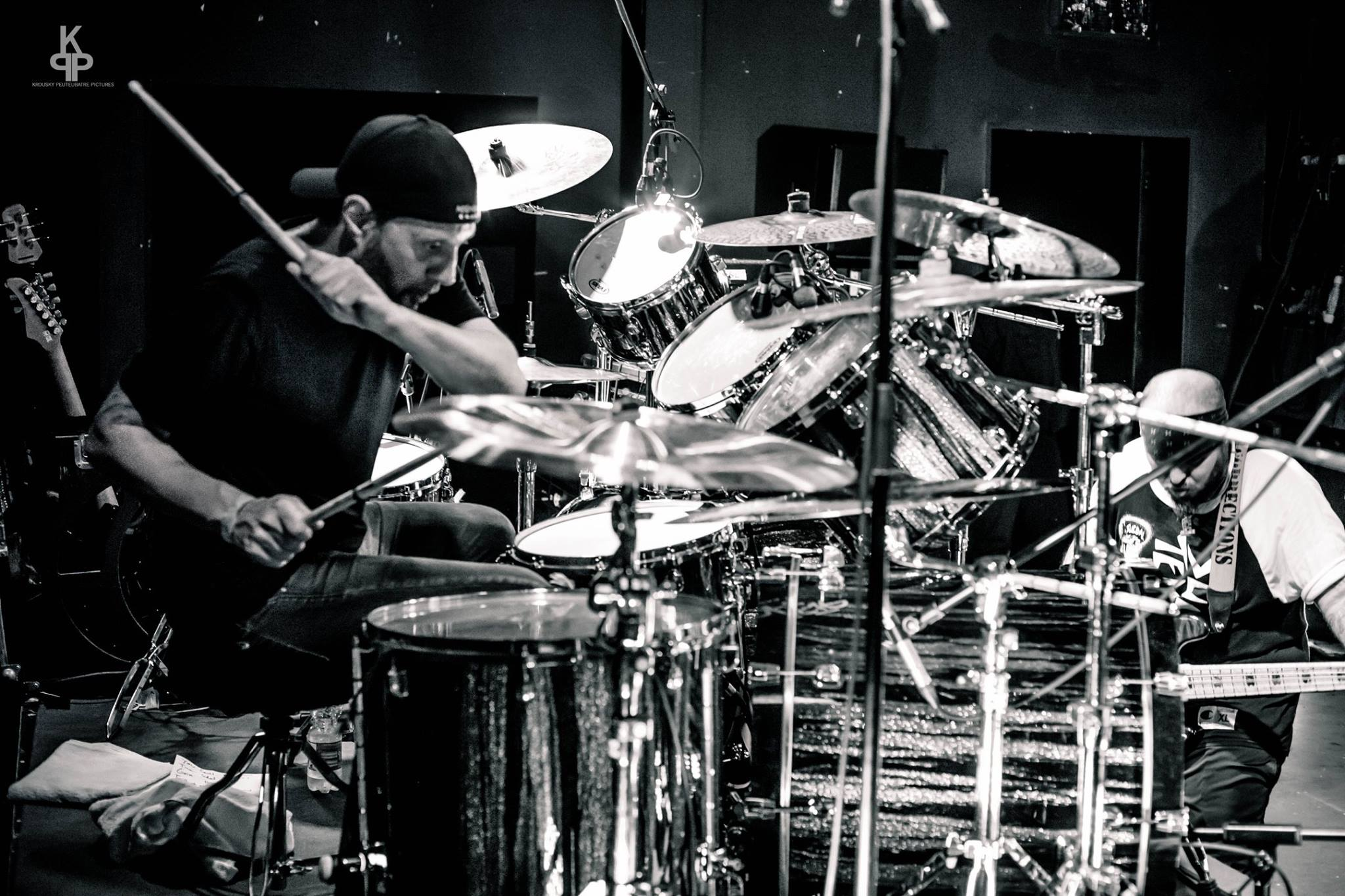
Former Slayer drummer Dave Lombardo, a longtime friend and supporter of Suicidal Tendencies, was a member of the band from 2016 to 2021.

On February 20, 2016, Suicidal Tendencies announced that former Slayer drummer Dave Lombardo, a longtime friend and supporter of the band, would be playing drums on their February–March 2016 tour with Megadeth, and again on their May–June 2016 European tour. On May 6, 2016, guitarist Nico Santora announced on his Facebook page that he had left Suicidal Tendencies to focus on his new project Lillake. He was replaced by Oneironaut guitarist Jeff Pogan.

On May 15, 2016, Suicidal Tendencies posted a video of Lombardo laying down tracks for the band's follow-up to 13, which was expected to be released in September. This video implied that Lombardo had become a permanent member of Suicidal Tendencies. On June 17, 2016, Suicidal Tendencies announced in a newsletter that they were in the final stages of mixing the new album, which was expected to be released on September 30, 2016. Mike Muir revealed in June 2016 interviews that the album would be called The World Gone Mad, and that the band planned to release a new EP in January 2017. However, the title of the album was later shortened to World Gone Mad. It was supported by the band's first single in 22 years (since 1994's "Love Vs. Loneliness") "Clap Like Ozzy". To promote World Gone Mad, Suicidal Tendencies supported Megadeth, Amon Amarth and Metal Church on the Dystopia tour in the United States in September–October 2016, and headlined two tours in 2017: the Persistence Tour with Agnostic Front in Europe in January, and a U.S. tour in February–March with Crowbar and Havok. Muir had stated in interviews that World Gone Mad may be Suicidal Tendencies' final studio album, though he later retracted this statement, saying, "You can't believe what anybody says nowadays – everybody's effin' lyin'."

=== Get Your Fight On!, Still Cyco Punk After All These Years and upcoming fifteenth studio album (2018–present) ===
On December 1, 2017, Suicidal Tendencies announced that they had completed work on a new EP with producer Paul Northfield for an early 2018 release. Muir has described the EP as "a little more specifically a statement of the time" and an effort that "could be interpreted as political." The EP, Get Your Fight On!, was released on March 9, 2018, and was the first of two releases the band had planned for release that year; the second being a new full-length, Still Cyco Punk After All These Years, released on September 7, 2018. The latter is a near re-recording of Cyco Miko's first album Lost My Brain! (Once Again).

On July 2, 2018, it was announced that guitarist Jeff Pogan had left Suicidal Tendencies for personal reasons. Former The Dillinger Escape Plan guitarist Ben Weinman filled in for him on the band's summer and fall 2018 shows.

In March 2019, Weinman announced on his Twitter page that he was in the studio tracking down new material for the next Suicidal Tendencies album. In a July 2020 interview with Ultimate Guitar, however, Weinman stated that "there hasn't been any music made", but also stated that "maybe when all this comes back, when things go back to normal, we can think about that."

On March 18, 2020, Muir announced on Suicidal Tendencies' Facebook page that they are working on an "old-school vinyl release" featuring instrumental "songs from ST members and people related to ST." Drummer Brandon Pertzborn had filled in Lombardo (who around this time had joined Mr. Bungle and Testament) as a drummer for the band as well as Tye Trujillo filling as a bassist, most likely due to the relationship his father, Robert Trujillo has with the band. Weinman announced that there would be new Suicidal Tendencies shows soon. On January 7, 2023, the official Suicidal Tendencies social media account streamed what seemed to be a new song for a new album.

Drummer Greyson Nekrutman announced on April 18, 2023 via his social media page that he would be joining Suicidal Tendencies as the replacement of Brandon Pertzborn, who later joined The Offspring. In February of the following year, Nekrutman left the band to join Sepultura on their final world tour and was replaced by current Infectious Grooves and former Slipknot drummer Jay Weinberg.

On July 5, 2024, Suicidal Tendencies released a new version of their 1999 track "We Are Family" entirely in Portuguese under the title "Nós Somos Família". This marked the band's first song with Weinman, Trujillo and Weinberg, and included additional vocals by Brazilian musicians Badauí (CPM 22), João Gordo (Ratos de Porão), B Negão (Planet Hemp), Rodrigo Lima (Dead Fish), Supla, Fernanda Lira (Crypta), Milton Aguiar (Bayside Kings), Mayara Puertas (Torture Squad), Felipe Ribeiro (Treva), Pirata Homes (Anjo dos Becos), Ya Amaral (Eskrota), Júnior Bass, as well as football player Marinho and skateboarder Sandro Dias. Thiago Castanho and Marcão Britto also provided guitar on the track. Suicidal Tendencies released its first original song in nine years, "Adrenaline Addict", on April 18, 2025, which coincided with the band opening for Metallica on selected dates to their M72 World Tour the same month. In December 2025, they were announced on the line-up the 2026 Milwaukee Metal Fest.

On January 11, 2026, Jay Weinberg announced his departure from the band, leaving to focus on being a first-time father as well as other creative projects. Xavier Ware, known simply by the nickname X, was announced as the group's new drummer in an Instagram post on January 23, 2026.

In April the band played at both weekends at Coachella, during the first weekend they were joined on stage by former bass player Thundercat and Metallica‘s Robert Trujillo. The band also appeared at Welcome to Rockville taking place in Daytona Beach, Florida in May 2026. They are scheduled to play a mini East Coast tour alongside Cro-Mags in the late Summer of 2026.

== Musical style ==
While their early material, including their self-titled debut album, is considered hardcore punk, the band is well known for combining elements of thrash metal with funk, punk rock and alternative rock. Billboard wrote the band combined a "breathtaking variety of styles, blazing new trails in the fusion of hardcore, thrash metal and funk while introducing new elements with each subsequent album." They also noted that, by the time their 1992 album The Art of Rebellion was released, "Suicidal Tendencies had evolved into a versatile alt-metal act that leaned on its prog and jazz fusion influences for the highly textured sound the band still embraces in concert today." Critics have also described Suicidal Tendencies as "the godfathers" of the genre crossover thrash, which they have been credited for creating along with Texas-based band D.R.I. and New York-based Stormtroopers of Death. Metal Hammer wrote "Suicidal went on to fuse the worlds of punk, thrash and skate with a biting social commentary, inspiring countless musicians in the process." Frontman Mike Muir has cited bands such as Black Sabbath, Sex Pistols and Parliament as an influence on Suicidal Tendencies.

== Image and legacy ==
Throughout the band's early years they did not have the best reputation in their home state of California especially in Los Angeles. This was due to the band often being accused by the local media of having gang affiliations, along with the violence at their shows. Vocalist Mike Muir later recalled, "In 1990, we toured and the police crash unit would be waiting for us when we pulled in for soundcheck. It was like the 3 o'clock greeting. We kind of felt special, actually. Most of the things that happen to us would be a publicist's dream; like when the Secret Service came to my house, but stuff like that's not what we're about." These factors would ultimately lead to Suicidal Tendencies being banned from playing shows in and around Los Angeles until the early 1990s. Commenting on the band's gang affiliations in a 2008, interview with Cleveland Scene, Muir stated: "The world is a gang. There's certain words people use [to call attention and stigmatize], like 'Oh, oh, oh!' Anybody that grew up in Venice, if you didn't know somebody that was in a gang, you didn't know anybody. It has nothing to do with anything."

Suicidal Tendencies are often regarded as an influential band in the hardcore and overall punk genre. While the band initially faced criticism for getting involved with mainstream culture, such as having their music video for "Institutionalized" played on MTV. It became one of the first hardcore videos to be played in heavy rotation on the channel and according to Ultimate Guitar the song ended up helping "expanded the hardcore culture to a mainstream audience for the first time, influencing an entire generation of fans." Vice dubbed the band's 1983 self-titled debut album "one of the most important hardcore punk albums in history, adding that it "made an impact on many suburban grommets because of its aesthetic. It was the first time middle America outside of California got a taste of LA gang culture and, more importantly, the art and graffiti that accompanied it." Metal Hammer also dubbed it "one of the most influential records in heavy music."

Regarding Suicidal Tendencies' identity as a crossover thrash band, RockLists.com wrote, "As the band grew heavier and faster on Join the Army in 1987 and then a run of albums for Epic, they helped build the crossover thrash sound, and they're often named among the genre's founding fathers alongside D.R.I., Corrosion of Conformity and Stormtroopers of Death. The Art of Rebellion in 1992 stretched into funk and progressive shapes and delivered 'Asleep at the Wheel'." The band has been credited for having a significant influence on the crossover thrash genre, with Loudwire calling them "The kings of crossover thrash" and dubbing their 1990 album Lights...Camera...Revolution! as "one of the most important thrash records in history." The band also developed a large following among skateboarders, with AllMusic writing that they "had a major hand in the creation of skatepunk." For their contributions, the band was later inducted into the Skateboarding Hall of Fame in 2016.

Various artists have expressed their admiration for Suicidal Tendencies or have cited them as an influence, including Anthrax, Body Count, Children of Bodom, Green Day, Hatebreed, Jane's Addiction, Killswitch Engage, Metallica, Megadeth, Municipal Waste, NOFX, The Offspring, Pantera, Rage Against the Machine, Rise of the Northstar, Sepultura, Sevendust, Skrillex, Slayer, Slipknot, Soulfly, Staind, and Terror.

== Band members ==
Current

- Mike "Cyco Miko" Muir – lead vocals (1980–1995, 1996–present)
- Dean Pleasants – lead guitar, backing vocals (1996–present)
- Ben Weinman – rhythm guitar, backing vocals (2018–present)
- Tye Trujillo – bass (2021–present)
- Xavier Ware – drums (2026–present)

== Discography ==
- Suicidal Tendencies (1983)
- Join the Army (1987)
- How Will I Laugh Tomorrow When I Can't Even Smile Today (1988)
- Controlled by Hatred/Feel Like Shit...Déjà Vu (1989)
- Lights...Camera...Revolution! (1990)
- The Art of Rebellion (1992)
- Still Cyco After All These Years (1993)
- Suicidal for Life (1994)
- Freedumb (1999)
- Free Your Soul and Save My Mind (2000)
- No Mercy Fool!/The Suicidal Family (2010)
- 13 (2013)
- World Gone Mad (2016)
- Still Cyco Punk After All These Years (2018)

== Awards and nominations ==
Grammy Award

| Year | Nominee / work | Award | Result |
|---|---|---|---|
| 1991 | Lights...Camera...Revolution! | Best Metal Performance | Nominated |
| 1994 | "Institutionalized" | Best Metal Performance with Vocal | Nominated |

Skateboarding Hall of Fame

| Year | Nominee / work | Award | Result |
|---|---|---|---|
| 2016 | Suicidal Tendencies | Hall of Fame | Inducted |
