= Live at the Olympic Auditorium =

Video by Suicidal Tendencies
- Released: January 26, 2010
- Recorded: Grand Olympic Auditorium, October 29, 2005
- Genre: Crossover thrash, hardcore punk
- Label: Suicidal Records, Fontana Distribution

Suicidal Tendencies chronology
Lights...Camera...Suicidal (1990)	Live at the Olympic Auditorium (2010)

Live at the Olympic Auditorium is a concert film by American rock band Suicidal Tendencies, recorded live at the Grand Olympic Auditorium in Los Angeles on 2005. The video was released through the band's own Suicidal Records on January 26, 2010.

== Track listing ==
1. "Intro" – 1:38
2. "I Shot Reagan" – 2:47
3. "War Inside My Head" – 3:52
4. "Subliminal" – 5:37
5. "Ain't Gonna Take It" – 3:41
6. "Suicidal Failure" – 3:38
7. "Send Me Your Money" – 3:55
8. "We Are Family" – 4:38
9. "Possessed to Skate" – 3:28
10. "I Saw Your Mommy" – 6:00
11. "Waking the Dead" – 3:19
12. "Show Some Love...Tear It Down!" – 4:47
13. "Cyco Vision" – 2:17
14. "Two-Sided Politics" – 1:46
15. "Won't Fall in Love Today" – 3:58
16. "Institutionalized" – 6:25
17. "Pledge Your Allegiance" – 5:49

== Personnel ==
- Mike Muir - Lead Vocals
- Mike Clark - Rhythm Guitar
- Dean Pleasants - Lead Guitar
- Thundercat - Bass
- Dave Hidalgo - Drums

Recorded and mixed by Paul Northfield
Directed by Glen Bennett
