= Greyson Nekrutman =

American drummer (born 2002)

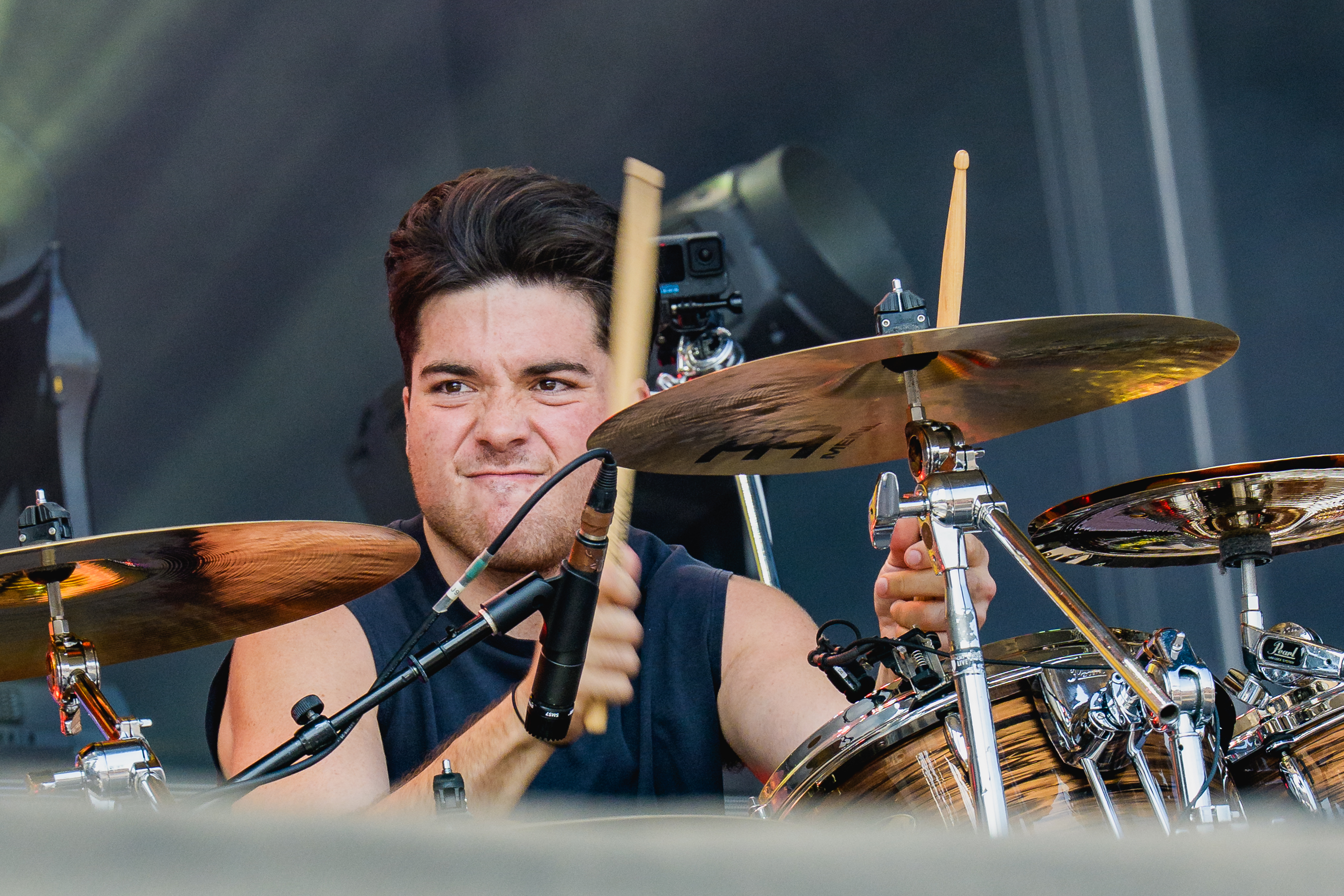
- Nekrutman with Sepultura in 2026

Background information
- Born: June 13, 2002 (age 24); Long Island, New York, U.S.
- Genres: Heavy metal; thrash metal; groove metal; crossover thrash; big band; jazz
- Occupation: Musician
- Instruments: Drums; percussion
- Years active: 2019–present
- Formerly of: Suicidal Tendencies; Sepultura

Greyson Nekrutman (born June 13, 2002) is an American musician, known as the former drummer of crossover thrash band Suicidal Tendencies between 2023 and 2024, and drummer of Brazilian heavy metal band Sepultura for its final two years from 2024 to 2026.

== Biography ==
Nekrutman started playing drums at age four, being taught many genres, including Latin, jazz and rock. He became known as a jazz and big band drummer, being influenced by the likes of Sonny Payne, Louie Bellson, Buddy Rich, Gene Krupa, Max Roach and Art Blakey, as well as other jazz influenced drummers like Carter Beauford, Mitch Mitchell and Ginger Baker.

He is featured on William Duvall (Alice in Chains)'s album 11.12.21 Live-in-Studio Nashville, which was released in June 2022.

He gained more recognition when he joined crossover thrash band Suicidal Tendencies in April 2023, replacing Brandon Pertzborn. He stayed with Suicidal Tendencies until he joined Sepultura in February 2024, replacing Eloy Casagrande. Casagrande had replaced Jay Weinberg as a member of Slipknot, who in turn took Nekrutman's place in Suicidal Tendencies. Nekrutman was present on Sepultura's 2026 EP The Cloud of Unknowing, which was released to coincide with the conclusion of the band's final farewell tour, after which they broke up.
