= No Mercy (metal band) =

American thrash metal band

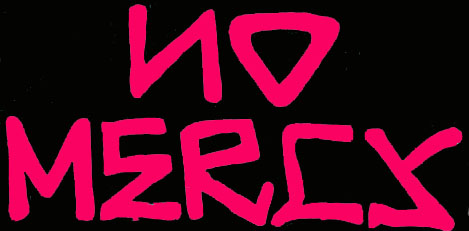

Background information
- Origin: Venice, California, U.S.
- Genres: Thrash metal
- Years active: 1982–1987, 2000–present
- Labels: Suicidal Records
- Members: Mike Clark; Mike Muir
- Past members: Ken Blakley; Keven Guercio; Ric Clayton; Sal Troy

No Mercy is an American thrash metal band from Venice, California, the brainchild of guitarist Mike Clark who later played in Suicidal Tendencies.

== History ==
The band started in 1982 and featured lead vocalist Keven Guercio, guitarist Mike Clark, bassist Ken Blakley later replaced by Ric "Rancid" Clayton (the artist who designed the Suicidal Tendencies logo as well as the shirts on S.T.'s first album) and drummer Sal Troy. Guercio recorded a few demos and the tracks on the Welcome to Venice (1985) compilation before leaving and moving to Jackson Hole, Wyoming and was replaced by Suicidal Tendencies vocalist Mike Muir. Muir signed them to his independent label "Suicidal Records".

In 1987 No Mercy released their first and only album Widespread Bloodshed Love Runs Red, and were about to record their second album with many new songs already written but Clayton and Troy quit. Instead of recruiting new members, Muir decided to "merge" the two bands by having Clark join Suicidal Tendencies.

Clark took over much of the songwriting duties for Suicidal, shifting its style more to a melodic thrash metal sound similar to No Mercy's and what would have been No Mercy's second album became Suicidal Tendencies' third album, How Will I Laugh Tomorrow When I Can't Even Smile Today.

In 1989 Suicidal Tendencies released the Controlled by Hatred/Feel Like Shit... Déjà Vu double-EP. Many of the songs on it, including "Waking The Dead" and "Controlled By Hatred", were re-recorded by Suicidal Tendencies from the Widespread Bloodshed album.

Muir and Clark relaunched the band in 2000 as "No Mercy Fool!" with all new members, mainly from Suicidal Tendencies and Infectious Grooves, and have contributed new recordings to the 2001 Suicidal Records compilation Suicidal Friends and Family – Vol. 2 and 2008's Year of the Cycos. They have since re-recorded more No Mercy songs as Suicidal Tendencies for their 2010 album No Mercy Fool!/The Suicidal Family.

Keven Guercio has since recorded a track called "Roll the Dice" (available on iTunes), featured on the compilation album Welcome 2 Venice (2007), with original members of Suicidal Tendencies including ex-bassist Louiche Mayorga who produced the album.

In early 2013, Mike Clark formed a new version of No Mercy under the name Waking the Dead (due to copyright issues with the WWF). They opened up for Suicidal Tendencies on their Slam City Tour. They are a three-piece and there are rumours of a new album and perhaps a re release of some old material.

== Members ==
- Mike Clark – guitar (1982–1987; 2000–present)
- Ken Blakley – bass (1982)
- Ric Clayton – bass (1982–1987)
- Sal Troy – drums (1982–1987; deceased)
- Kevin Guercio – lead vocals (1982–1985)
- Mike Muir – lead vocals (1985–1987; 2000–present)

== Discography ==
- Welcome to Venice (1985/Part of Compilation)
- Empty Skulls Vol. 1 they had three tracks on this compilation which was released on tape, some time in the 1980s.
- Skate Rock Vol. 5: Born to Skate with the track "Die or Be Killed" (1987, compilation)
- Widespread Bloodshed (Love Runs Red) (1987)
- OG No Mercy containing rehearsal-, demo- and live-recordings (2008)
- Year of the Cycos compilation (2008)

=== Compilations/others ===
- Infectious Grooves – Mas Borracho, Suicidal Records, 2000 (as "No Mercy Fool!")
- Suicidal Tendencies – Friends & Family, Vol. 2, Suicidal Records, 2001 (as "No Mercy Fool!")
