= Join the Army =

Studio album by Suicidal Tendencies
- Released: April 1987
- Recorded: January 1987 at Record Plant Studios, Los Angeles
- Genre: Hardcore punk; crossover thrash
- Length: 38:53
- Label: Caroline
- Producer: Lester Claypool, Suicidal Tendencies

Suicidal Tendencies chronology
Suicidal Tendencies (1983)	Join the Army (1987)	How Will I Laugh Tomorrow When I Can't Even Smile Today (1988)

Singles from Join the Army
- 1. "Possessed to Skate" Released: 1987

Join the Army is the second studio album by American crossover thrash band Suicidal Tendencies. It was released in April 1987, and is one of the most well known albums for crossing over the genres of punk and thrash metal, known as crossover thrash, a genre that Suicidal Tendencies have been credited for creating. Join the Army is arguably one of Suicidal Tendencies' most popular efforts, although it only reached No. 100 on the Billboard 200 chart. This was their first album with guitarist Rocky George and drummer R.J. Herrera, and their last recording with bassist Louiche Mayorga (although he did co-write songs on their next album How Will I Laugh Tomorrow When I Can't Even Smile Today). This is also the last album to feature the band playing hardcore punk before an extended period with a more thrash metal focus. However, on some more recent albums, hardcore punk is again part of the mix.

== Musical style ==
Mike Muir used vastly different vocal techniques and range compared to their debut album (sometimes sounding similar to Lemmy from Motörhead). Original guitarist Grant Estes had been replaced by Jon Nelson in 1984, who was then soon replaced by Rocky George, who influenced the change of the band's sound into the thrash direction. Original drummer Amery Smith was replaced by R.J. Herrera, who used the particularly metal drum feature of double kick.

== Reception and legacy ==
Professional ratings
Review scores
Source	Rating
AllMusic	3/5 stars

Reviews for Join the Army were mostly positive. AllMusic's Eduardo Rivadavia gave it three stars out of five and called it "a transitional album in the transformation of the band's sound from hardcore punk to thrash metal".

Join the Army was also the first Suicidal Tendencies album to enter the Billboard 200; it peaked at No. 100, and remained on the chart for thirteen weeks. "Possessed to Skate" preceded the album's release as a single, which also had a music video created for it. The video featured old school skateboarding tricks, and as such is considered a classic visual period piece of skateboarding. The success of Join the Army garnered attention from major labels, including Epic Records, with whom Suicidal Tendencies would eventually sign in 1988.

"War Inside My Head" is featured in the game Guitar Hero: Metallica. "Possessed to Skate" is featured in the game Skate 2. "Suicidal Maniac" was covered by Hatebreed on their 2009 release For the Lions.

Over the years and with the involvement several line-ups, Suicidal Tendencies have recorded new versions of 10 of the 13 songs originally included in Join the Army, including two different new versions of two of those tracks: "War Inside My Head" and "A Little Each Day" (Still Cyco After All These Years); "Join the Army" and "Go Skate! (Possessed to Skate '97)" (Prime Cuts); "Two Wrongs Don't Make a Right" (Year of the Cycos); "Suicidal Maniac", "Possessed to Skate", "The Prisoner", "I Feel Your Pain... And I Survive", "Join the ST Army", "No Name, No Words", and "Born to Be Cyco" (No Mercy Fool!/The Suicidal Family).

== Track listing ==
Side one
No.	Title	Writer(s)	Length
1.	"Suicidal Maniac"	Rocky George, Mike Muir	2:57
2.	"Join the Army"	Louiche Mayorga, Mike Muir	3:37
3.	"You Got, I Want"	Suicidal Tendencies	2:55
4.	"A Little Each Day"	Muir	4:08
5.	"The Prisoner"	Mayorga, Muir	2:53
6.	"War Inside My Head"	Mayorga, Muir	3:51

Side two
No.	Title	Writer(s)	Length
7.	"I Feel Your Pain"	George, Muir	3:27
8.	"Human Guinea Pig"	Suicidal Tendencies	2:05
9.	"Possessed to Skate"	Mayorga, Muir	2:34
10.	"No Name, No Words"	Mayorga, Muir	2:35
11.	"Born to Be Cyco"	Mayorga, George, Muir	2:13
12.	"Two Wrongs Don't Make a Right (But They Make Me Feel a Whole Lot Better)"	George, Muir	2:49
13.	"Looking in Your Eyes"	Mayorga, Muir	2:50

- "War Inside My Head", "Human Guinea Pig", and "You Got, I Want" were originally written by previous guitarist Jon Nelson. He traded the rights for "War Inside My Head" for a Flying V guitar after he left the band.
- A different version of "War Inside My Head" was played live and existed as early as 1982, but with a different arrangement and lyrics. The song is sometimes labeled as "War Inside Myself" on certain bootleg releases but is an entirely different song that appeared on the 2nd Demo in 1982.
- "Human Guinea Pig" does not appear on vinyl or cassette versions of the album.

== Credits ==
- Mike Muir – lead vocals
- Louiche Mayorga – bass, backing vocals
- Rocky George – guitars, backing vocals
- R.J. Herrera – drums
- Recorded and mixed at Record Plant, Los Angeles, California
- Produced by Lester Claypool and Suicidal Tendencies
- Engineered by Lester Claypool
- Guitar and vocals recorded at Baby/O/
- Album cover by Michael Seiff

== Chart positions ==
=== Album ===
Billboard (North America)

Year	Chart	Position
1987	Billboard 200	100
