= Friends & Family, Vol. 2 =

Compilation album by Suicidal Tendencies
- Released: June 20, 2001
- Genre: Crossover thrash, funk metal
- Length: 74:02
- Label: Musicrama, Inc.

Suicidal Tendencies chronology
Free Your Soul And Save My Mind (2000)	Friends & Family, Vol. 2 (2001)	Year of the Cycos (2008)

Professional ratings
Review scores
Source	Rating
Kerrang!	3/5 stars

Friends & Family, Vol. 2 is a compilation CD of bands who are friends or associated with the crossover band Suicidal Tendencies.

== Track listing ==
No.	Title	Length
1.	"Free Your Soul... and Save My Mind" (Suicidal Tendencies)	3:52
2.	"Fight the Losing Battle" (Suicidal Tendencies)	3:12
3.	"Ain't Gonna Take It" (Suicidal Tendencies)	2:10
4.	"Lock It in the Pocket" (Infectious Grooves)	3:36
5.	"Cat Got My Tongue" (Infectious Grooves)	3:08
6.	"Plant the Seed" (Jeremiah Weed and the Bad Seed)	2:47
7.	"We're Evil (Sic Mix)" (Suicidal Tendencies, No Mercy Fool!)	4:13
8.	"Something Inside Me" (Suicidal Tendencies, No Mercy Fool!)	3:33
9.	"One Track Mind" (Missile Girl Scoot)	2:59
10.	"Big Mouth" (Missile Girl Scoot)	3:18
11.	"Inside" (Zen Vodou)	5:14
12.	"Sustain" (Zen Vodou)	5:22
13.	"Chain of Hate" (My Head)	3:39
14.	"Ultra Drown" (My Head)	4:39
15.	"Handguns and Heroin" (Creeper)	3:20
16.	"Soothing Effect of Violence" (The Funeral Party)	4:44
17.	"Swinging from the Family Tree" (The Funeral Party)	4:48
18.	"Whipcream (Live)" (Sarsippius with Infectious Grooves)	6:10
19.	"Contractual Disclaimer" (Jeremiah Weed and the Bad Seed)	1:24
20.	"Plant the Seed" (Jeremiah Weed and the Bad Seed)	1:54
