= You Can't Bring Me Down =

1990 single by Suicidal Tendencies

Single by Suicidal Tendencies

from the album Lights...Camera...Revolution!
- Released: 1990
- Recorded: December 1989–April 1990
- Studio: Rumbo, Los Angeles; Amigo, Hollywood
- Genre: Thrash metal, crossover thrash
- Length: 5:48
- Label: Epic
- Songwriters: Mike Muir; Rocky George
- Producers: Mark Dodson; Suicidal Tendencies

Suicidal Tendencies singles chronology
"How Will I Laugh Tomorrow" (1989)	"You Can't Bring Me Down" (1990)	"Send Me Your Money" (1990)

"You Can't Bring Me Down" is a song by Suicidal Tendencies, released in 1990 on the Lights...Camera...Revolution! album. It delivered moderate commercial success, and aided in the band's transition from punk rock to thrash metal. Although the song never reached any of the major music charts, it was a successful single.

== Content ==
The song begins with a hypnotic whammy bar solo, then goes into a clean, almost acoustic sounding rhythm guitar part, and then a guitar solo is added over it. The solo continues for a while, featuring 8-finger tapping and shredding, then the tempo speeds up and the song breaks into the main riff, and the first verse of lyrics, and finally the chorus.

This continues until around 3:40, when suddenly the rhythm guitar is clean again, the tempo slows down, and another solo comes in. Then finally towards the end of the song it goes back to the main riff, only this time with lead vocalist Mike Muir ranting and almost talking instead of singing. Then the song goes back to the chorus, the chorus extends (with yet another guitar solo), and finally ends (Muir's last lyrics being "Suicidal!" and then cackling).

The song was written by Muir and lead guitarist Rocky George.

== Music video ==
A music video was made for "You Can't Bring Me Down", which was a major hit on MTV's Headbangers Ball. The video seemed mostly to be about the band's ban from appearances in Los Angeles; in the beginning of the video a newspaper pops up with the head line "Suicidal Tendencies Banned In L.A." It showed Mike Muir being taken prisoner by a few unnamed authorities, who eventually executed him on the electric chair, despite heavy revolt from Muir's "gang" (perhaps representative of S.T.'s fans), who try to help him escape.

When Muir is executed in the video you can see the United States Constitution flashing in the background, which is perhaps taking another stab at the PMRC, which the band believed limited the American constitutional right to freedom of speech.

The song was also used in Danny Way's part in the skate video, The DC Video.

== Track listing ==
No.	Title	Length
1.	"You Can't Bring Me Down"	5:48
2.	"Don't Give Me Your Nothing"	4:30
3.	"Waking the Dead"	6:54
