= Send Me Your Money =

1990 single by Suicidal Tendencies

Single by Suicidal Tendencies

from the album Lights...Camera...Revolution!
- Released: 1990
- Recorded: December 1989 – April 1990 at Rumbo Recorders, Canoga Park, California; Amigo Studios, Hollywood, California
- Genre: Thrash metal, funk metal
- Length: 3:22
- Label: Epic
- Songwriter(s): Mike Muir
- Producer(s): Mark Dodson; Suicidal Tendencies

Suicidal Tendencies singles chronology
"You Can't Bring Me Down" (1990)	"Send Me Your Money" (1990)	"Alone" (1991)

"Send Me Your Money" is a song by Suicidal Tendencies, released as a single in 1990 from their fifth studio album Lights...Camera...Revolution!. It featured a music video that received heavy airplay at MTV's Headbangers Ball and aided in Suicidal's transition from a punk metal band to a thrash metal one. This was the first and only Suicidal Tendencies single to chart in the UK.

"Send Me Your Money" has held a regular position on Suicidal Tendencies' concert setlist since 1985, despite not appearing on an album until 1990.

== Composition and lyrics ==
The song begins with a drum intro, followed by a funky bass line from Robert Trujillo. Then the guitar comes in and the chorus is played without song. Then the verse begins, and it goes on as verse, chorus, verse, chorus, verse, chorus, verse, chorus. The main riff is the same as in "You'll Be Sorry" (part 2 of "Suicide's An Alternative") from Suicidal's eponymous album. Throughout the song, Muir delivers lyrics about crooked preachers stealing from gullible believers. The song also features two quick bass solos from Trujillo.

== Music video ==
The video begins with the band playing on a scene, then the chorus is played and the video switches between the band, Muir holding a camera in front of psychedelic backgrounds and a nude woman watching a TV. During the rest of the song, the video switches between the band, Muir and a preacher who seems very rich. The band also plays on a dinner table. During the chorus, all band members except Muir is singing "Send Me Your Money" imitating a gospel choir. The video finally ends with Muir smashing the TV with a sledgehammer. The video was also featured on Beavis and Butt-Head for the episode "Door to Door".

- Director: Sara Nichols
- Key Hair & Make-Up Artist: Jan Pedis
- Assistant Hair & Make-Up Artist: Gail Chanelli Lamby
