= How Will I Laugh Tomorrow When I Can't Even Smile Today =

Studio album by Suicidal Tendencies
- Released: September 13, 1988
- Recorded: April 1988
- Studio: Cherokee (Hollywood)
- Genre: Thrash metal; crossover thrash
- Length: 50:17
- Label: Epic
- Producer: Mark Dodson, Suicidal Tendencies

Suicidal Tendencies chronology
Join the Army (1987)	How Will I Laugh Tomorrow When I Can't Even Smile Today (1988)	Controlled by Hatred/Feel Like Shit... Déjà Vu (1989)

Singles from How Will I Laugh Tomorrow When I Can't Even Smile Today
- 1. "Trip at the Brain" Released: 1988; 2. "How Will I Laugh Tomorrow" Released: 1989

How Will I Laugh Tomorrow When I Can't Even Smile Today is the third studio album by American crossover thrash band Suicidal Tendencies. It was released on September 13, 1988 on Epic Records, the band's first album on that label. It was also their first album recorded with guitarist Mike Clark and their only release with bassist Bob Heathcote, who was replaced by Robert Trujillo in 1989.

It is considered to be an essential release in the genre by Revolver.

== Musical style ==
How Will I Laugh... represents a critical step in Suicidal Tendencies' stylistic evolution, in that it captures the band abandoning most of their full-fledged punk influences in favor of a more thrash-oriented sound. One begins to hear this stylistic shift in this album's predecessor Join the Army, with 'How Will I Laugh' delivering a distinctly more defined metal sound, with more complex and lengthy songs, and better production values.

The addition of a rhythm guitarist Mike Clark (who had played with vocalist Mike Muir in No Mercy, which was supposed to originally be a metal-only side project) changed the band's style heavily as well. Clark wrote much of the music for this album and gave lead guitarist Rocky George more soloing time, thus creating another factor in this album and future albums' more metal-oriented sound.

The album's back cover shows each member standing in front of the side of the Saint Sophia Cathedral in Los Angeles, while the front cover shows the members standing in front of the mausoleum next to the church.

== Reception ==
Professional ratings
Review scores
Source	Rating
AllMusic	4.5/5 stars

Reviews for How Will I Laugh Tomorrow When I Can't Even Smile Today have been mostly positive. AllMusic's Steve Huey awards the album four-and-a-half stars out of five, and described it as "one of its best efforts". For the musical direction, Huey stated, "The band's thrashy fusion of its hardcore roots with speed metal was fully developed by this point, and Mike Muir's social commentary and self-analysis were as ragingly compelling and by turns amusing as ever." In the review made two months after the album release, RPM editors called the band one of the best of the current crop.

How Will I Laugh Tomorrow When I Can't Even Smile Today was moderately successful, peaking at number 111 on the US Billboard 200. It remained on that chart for eleven weeks. The album featured the singles "Trip at the Brain" and the title track, both of which managed to become successful with their target audiences.

In August 2014, Revolver placed the album on its "14 Thrash Albums You Need to Own" list.

== Track listing ==
Original release
No.	Title	Writer(s)	Length
1.	"Trip at the Brain"	Mike Clark, Mike Muir	4:32
2.	"Hearing Voices"	Louiche Mayorga, Muir	4:13
3.	"Pledge Your Allegiance"	Mayorga, Muir	4:32
4.	"How Will I Laugh Tomorrow"	Clark, Muir	6:44
5.	"The Miracle"	Clark, Muir	5:28
6.	"Surf and Slam"	Rocky George (guitar solo), Suicidal Tendencies	2:51
7.	"If I Don't Wake Up"	Clark, Muir	4:53
8.	"Sorry?!"	George, Muir	3:47
9.	"One Too Many Times"	Clark, Muir	3:13
10.	"The Feeling's Back"	Clark, Muir	4:04

CD version
No.	Title	Writer(s)	Length
1.	"Trip at the Brain"	Clark, Muir	4:32
2.	"Hearing Voices"	Mayorga, Muir	4:13
3.	"Pledge Your Allegiance"	Mayorga, Muir	4:32
4.	"How Will I Laugh Tomorrow"	Clark, Muir	6:44
5.	"The Miracle"	Clark, Muir	5:28
6.	"Suicyco Mania"	Mayorga, Muir	5:52
7.	"Surf and Slam"	Rocky George (guitar solo), Suicidal Tendencies	2:51
8.	"If I Don't Wake Up"	Clark, Muir	4:53
9.	"Sorry?!"	George, Muir	3:47
10.	"One Too Many Times"	Clark, Muir	3:13
11.	"The Feeling's Back"	Clark, Muir	4:04

- Track notes: "Suicyco Mania" is exclusive to the CD version of the album and does not appear on the vinyl or cassette versions. A near instrumental version (removing all the vocals outside of the title chant) was released as the B-side of "Trip at the Brain" and can also be heard on the F.N.G. compilation.

== Credits ==
- Mike Muir – vocals
- Rocky George – lead guitar
- Mike Clark – rhythm guitar
- R.J. Herrera – drums
- Bob Heathcote – bass
- Cherokee Studios, Hollywood, California – recording location
- Mark Dodson – producer, engineer
- Suicidal Tendencies – producer
- Mike Bosley – engineer
- Mark "Weissguy" Weiss – photography

== Chart positions ==
=== Album ===
Billboard (North America)

Year	Chart	Position
1988	Billboard 200	111
