= Excel (band) =

American crossover thrash band

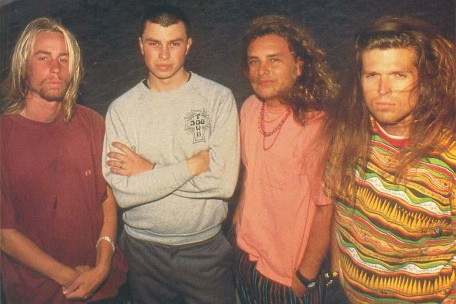
- Excel in 1988, L–R: Adam Siegel, Shaun Ross, Greg Saenz and Dan Clements

Background information
- Also known as: Chaotic Noise (1983–1985)
- Origin: Venice, California, U.S.
- Genre: Crossover thrash
- Years active: 1983–1996; 2012–present
- Labels: Suicidal; High Speed; Caroline; Delicious Vinyl; Capitol; Malicious
- Spinoffs: My Head
- Members: Dan Clements; Shaun Ross; Greg Cerwonka; Damon DeLaPaz
- Past members: Adam Siegel; Brandon Rudley; Rickey Palamino; Evan Warech; Max Asher; Vic Caruso; Greg Saenz; Michael Cosgrove; Carlos Gutierrez; Alex Barreto

Excel is a crossover thrash band from Venice, California, founded by singer Dan Clements and guitarist Adam Siegel in 1983. Known as Chaotic Noise until 1985, they were influenced by early punk rock bands like the Germs and Black Flag, as well as heavy metal bands like Black Sabbath, Trouble, Slayer, Corrosion of Conformity and Cryptic Slaughter. Being influenced by street art, Excel is also known for spray painting on the streets of the cities where they make their tours, hence why there are many different logos of the band.

Excel came out of the West Side Los Angeles crossover thrash scene as did many others in California like No Mercy, Beowülf, Suicidal Tendencies and Cryptic Slaughter. They are sometimes associated with other acts in the thrash metal scene like Testament, Overkill and Megadeth.

Excel has released three studio albums, three split albums, five demos, three singles and two live albums; the band broke up in 1995 but in 2001 they released reissues of their first two albums, Split Image (1987) and The Joke's on You (1989), with some bonus tracks. In August 2009 they edited a special collection of eight DVDs of their tours around Europe and Los Angeles and published them on their official MySpace. The band reformed in 2012.

== History ==
=== Formation (1983–1985) ===
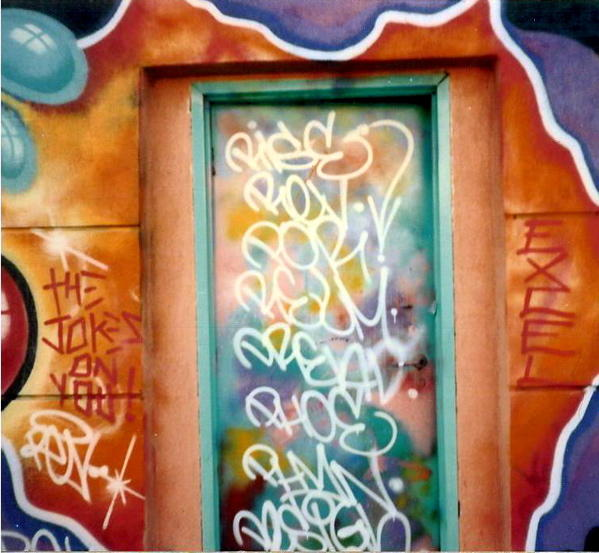
Kings Stop at Nothing graffiti.

The band was formed by Dan Clements and Adam Siegel in 1983 under the name Chaotic Noise. Evan Warech joined as drummer, while the bass was occupied by a lot of different musicians that year, with Clements later saying "We had a different bassist every four months, and people just figured we were unstable." In 1984, Rickey Pallamino took over the four strings; with the lineup finally completed, they recorded their first demo. In 1985, Warech and Pallamino left the band; the latter was replaced by Shaun Ross, who created the name "Excel" with his friends from the LA graffiti crew KSN (Kings Stop at Nothing), changing the band name.

=== First demos, Split Image and The Joke's on You (1985–1993) ===
A few months later a new drummer joined Excel: Greg Saenz. Excel participated in the compilation Welcome to Venice (released by Suicidal Records) which includes three of their songs. In the next few months they recorded three demos: Sonic Decapitation in February 1985, Personal Onslaught on June 9 and Refuse to Quit in January 1986. In 1987 they participated in the tape Thrasher Skate Rock 5: Born to Skate which included their song "Insecurity"; also recorded on their first studio album, Split Image (recorded by Suicidal Records and released by Caroline Records), released in July the same year. Excel had performed live in Los Angeles frequently, but the June 16, 1987, they gave their first official concert at the Fender's Grand Ballroom of Long Beach, California, and a second time March 18, 1988, to promote their new album. Later that year, they edited their first single, a cover of the song "Message in a Bottle" originally released by The Police in the album Regatta de Blanc in September 1979. In early 1989, Excel recorded another single, "Blaze Some Hate", to promote their second studio album: The Joke's on You, released June 20, 1989, by Caroline Records. In March, the band made a show at Chuck Landis' Country Club in Reseda, California and the Palasades Theater in San Diego (with the band B'LAST!). In November, Excel made their first tour, which was made in Netherlands in the cities of Sneek, Heemskerk, Eindhoven, Rotterdam, Goes and Den Bosch.

On their return to United States, Excel played at the Palace in Hollywood, the Star Club in Ybor City, Florida, and Philadelphia during 1990. Then Adam Siegel joined the ranks of Infectious Grooves to record the album The Plague That Makes Your Booty Move...It's the Infectious Grooves in 1991; he got back in 1992 to play at the Whisky a Go Go in Hollywood. A few months later they recorded their fifth demo: Third album demos; the songs of this demo were used later in the reissue of The Joke's on You.

Also in 1991, Excel piqued interest in taking legal action against heavy metal band Metallica over the song "Enter Sandman", which they claim borrows heavily from Excel's song "Tapping into the Emotional Void", originally included on The Joke's on You LP, released in 1989, two years before the release of Metallica's Black Album (it was most eventually echoed by Megadeth frontman Dave Mustaine in a 2004 interview), but nothing moved forward due to improper legal counsel.

=== Seeking Refuge and disbandment (1993–2000) ===
In 1993, Siegel returned to Infectious Grooves to record the album Sarsippius' Ark on February 16 of the same year; then he and Greg Saenz got together to form the power trio My Head, leaving Excel definitely. After three years of silence, with Brandon Rudley, from the San Fernando Valley metal band Immorally Demonic, on guitar and Max Asher (listed on credits as "Max") on drums, Excel returned with a new stoner metal style to record a new split album with the band Shrine. They recorded their last single to promote their third studio album: Seeking Refuge, released August 29, 1995. After releasing the album, Clements was unable to find a replacement for Max Asher on drums, preventing the band from playing live shows. Vic Caruso joined Excel as drummer and toured with the band in support of the album, playing at the Board in Orange County festival at the CSU Dominguez Hills Velodrome in Carson, California in May 1995. Caruso can be seen playing drums in the music video for "Unenslaved". The band toured the US, headlining shows and also opening for bands such as Marilyn Manson. In 2000, Rudley died from a brain aneurysm at the age of 25 and Excel was officially disbanded a few months later.

In May 2006, singer Dan Clements joined forces with original Suicidal Tendencies members Grant Estes (guitar), Amery Smith (drums) and Louiche Mayorga (bass) and the former No Mercy Kevin Guercio (vocals) to form the band Against to record two tracks for a new split album called Welcome 2 Venice. After the release of the album there were rumors about a possible Excel reunion, however Clements said he had no intentions of reforming the band and did not want anyone to take Against as a return of the group.

=== Reunion (2012–present) ===
Excel announced their reunion in January 2012. Involved in the reunion at the time were Dan Clements on vocals, Shaun Ross on bass and Greg Saenz on drums; guitarist Adam Siegel was asked to participate but he declined the offer, and the band replaced him with Alex Barreto. On March 30, 2013, Excel played their first reunion show at a private party at RVCA in Los Angeles, California.

Excel is still active as of 2025, and they perform shows occasionally, mostly around the areas of Southern California. The band is currently working on new music for their first studio album in more than three decades. Their new album is expected to be released in February 2027.

== Members ==
Current lineup

- Dan Clements – lead vocals (1983–1996, 2012–present)
- Shaun Ross – bass guitar (1985–1996, 2012–present)
- Greg Cerwonka – guitar (2024–present)
- Damon DeLaPaz – drums (2024–present)

Former members

- Adam Siegel – guitar (1983–1992)
- Alex Barreto – guitar (2012–2024)
- Evan Warech – drums (1983–1985)
- Rickey Pallamino – bass guitar (1984–1985)
- Brandon Rudley – guitar (1992–1996)
- Greg Saenz – drums (1985–1992, 2012–2014, 2016–2018)
- Max Asher – drums (1992–1995)
- Vic Caruso – drums (1995–1996)
- Michael Cosgrove – drums (2014–2016)
- Carlos Gutierrez – drums (2018–2024)

Timeline

== Discography ==
=== Studio albums ===
Year	Title	Label
1987	Split Image	Suicidal/Caroline
1989	The Joke's on You	Caroline
1995	Seeking Refuge	Delicious Vinyl/Capitol

=== Live albums ===
All live albums are self-produced

Year	Title
1989	Live at the Nighttown, Rotterdam
1990	Live in Philadelphia, PA

=== Split albums ===
Year	Title	Label
1985	Welcome to Venice	Suicidal
1987	Thrasher Skate Rock 5: Born to Skate	High Speed
1995	Excel/Shrine	Malicious

=== DVDs ===
All DVDs are self-produced and were released in August 2009

Recorded	Title
1989	Live at Bolwerk
1989	Live at the Willem II
1989	Live at the Donkey Shot
1989	Live at the Nighttown
1989	Live at the Podium 'T Beest
1989	Live at the Dynamo
1989	Live in Europe
1987–1992	Live in L.A.

=== Demos ===
All demos are self-produced

Year	Title
1984	Demo
1985	Sonic Decapitation
1985	Personal Onslaught
1986	Refuse to Quit
1992	Third Album Demos

=== Singles ===
Year	Title	Label
1988	"Message in a Bottle"	Suicidal/Caroline
1989	"Blaze Some Hate"	Caroline
1995	"Excel"	Capitol
