= Greg Saenz =

American drummer

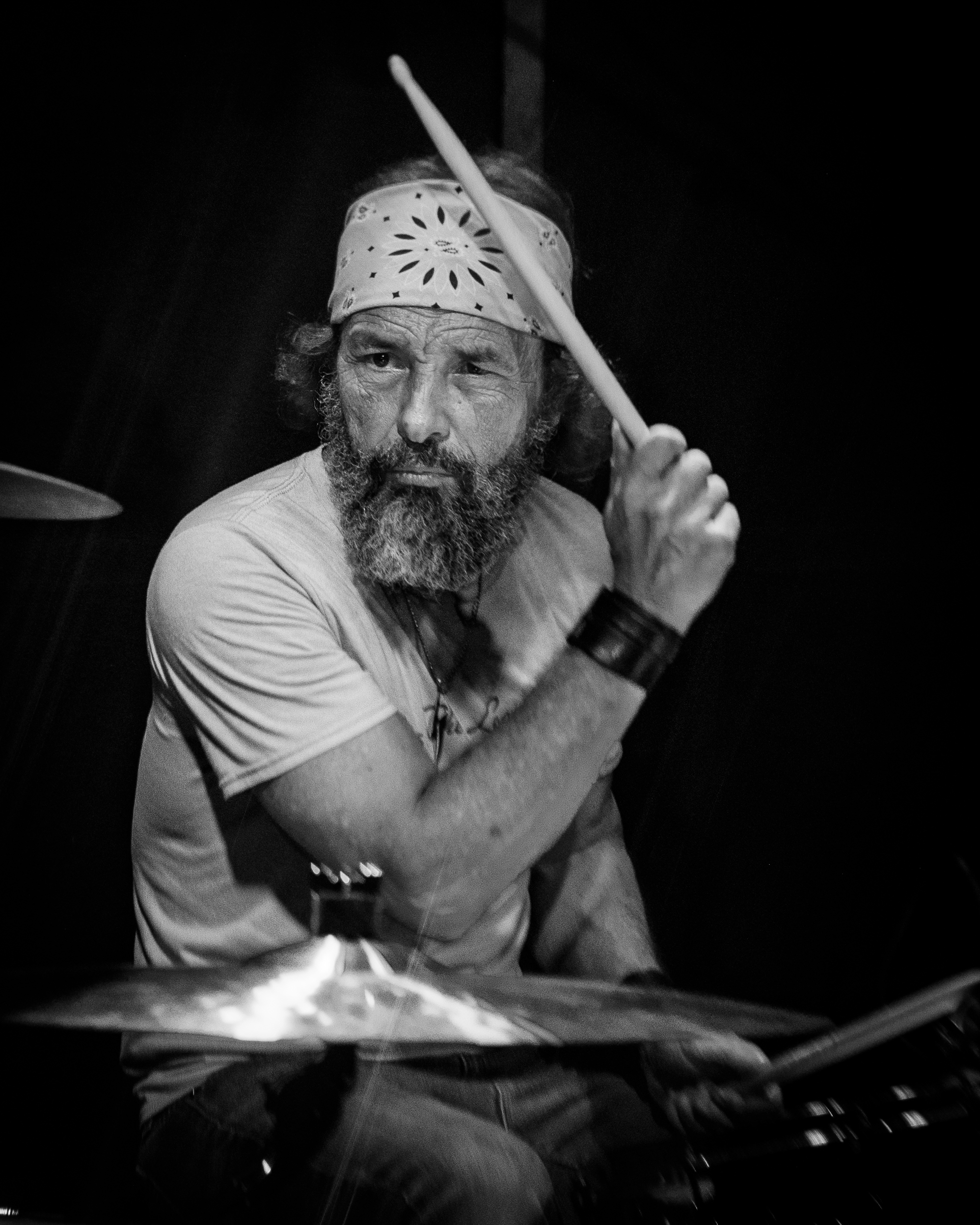
- With Yawning Man in Arendal, Norway, 2023

Background information
- Born: Gregory Saenz; April 27, 1967 (age 58); Los Angeles
- Origin: Los Angeles, United States
- Genres: Crossover thrash, desert rock, alternative rock, punk rock
- Occupations: Musician
- Instruments: Drums
- Years active: 1984–present

Greg Saenz (a.k.a. Gregory Pecker) (born April 27, 1967) is an American drummer from Highland Park, California, currently based in Coachella Valley. He started playing for groups around North East Los Angeles in 1985, mainly influenced by drummers such as John Bonham, Cozy Powell and Phil Taylor. He later joined Excel where he stayed for several years. Saenz is a former member of My Head and the Dwarves. He occasionally serves as a touring drummer for Yawning Man, and is currently a touring drummer for John Garcia and the Band of Gold.

== Biography ==
Saenz was born in East Los Angeles, raised in Highland Park. He took interest in music at a young age influenced by 1960s and 1970s rock and roll and hard rock musicians such as The Who, The Rolling Stones and Led Zeppelin. In 1985 he joined his first band, Wreched Horde. They were inspired by NWOBHM, but Saenz modified their style to some extent- (Greg said: "We sounded like UFO, Iron Maiden and Judas Priest, but I was already playing their songs a bit faster as I had gotten into tape trading in '83 and had been turned on to hardcore punk and thrash....bands like Venom, Motörhead, Suicidal Tendencies, Slayer, and Minor Threat".) Wreched Horde was offered a demo deal with Chrysalis Records after playing a house party in Highland Park, but the band dissolved before it could gain momentum. In summer of 1986, Greg read an advertisement in Recycler Magazine that said: "Excel looking for a dedicated, talented, punk metal influence. No egos". Saenz called singer Dan Clements and after an audition with Adam Siegel Greg was asked to join as Excel's drummer. Between the rest of 1986 and 1989 they recorded three demo their first studio album (Split Image) in 1987 (the recording was paid by Mike Muir and distribution was conducted by Caroline Records), the second one (The Joke's on You) in 1989, and a tour in Netherlands the same year with that line-up. In January and February 1989 he recorded together with Dan Clements the background vocals for the fourth studio album by the thrash metal band Kreator, titled Extreme Aggression. In 1992, Excel recorded a fifth and last demo: Third album demos. The next year guitarist Adam Siegel left the band definitely to form the alternative rock and grunge power trio My Head, with Saenz on drums and the former Bad Radio member Dave Silva on bass. However, this project was interrupted on several occasions for Siegel's participation in Infectious Grooves.

In early 1996, Saenz became the drummer of the first solo release by Mike Muir (Suicidal Tendencies vocalist), together Adam Siegel, who recorded various tracks on the album. Then My Head signed a record contract with Capitol Records and released their debut album Endless Bummer, the song "Humbucker" became their only single and music video. The band broke up in the fall of 1997 and Saenz moved to Marin County. A My Head recording "The Beard" later ended up on an EP called Pneumonia August 29, 2000. Also the power trio appeared in the compilation album by Suicidal Tendencies titled Friends & Family, Vol. 2.

In the summer of 1999 Saenz re-locates to Coachella Valley and ends up joining The Dwarves for the Epitaph Records "Punk-O-Rama 2000 Tour" to promote their new album Come Clean, and played drums for the tenth studio album by The Dwarves, titled How To Win Friends And Influence People. Exiting The Dwarves in 2001, Saenz took a two-year hiatus, re-surfacing in 2003 to play in various desert bands such as Eagles of Death Metal, Vega, Forever Changing Concept, and You Know Who. In 2007, he returned to The Dwarves and made several tours around the United States, and Oceania between 2007 and 2012. In early 2010, he drummed on The Dwarves fourteenth studio release The Dwarves Are Born Again, and is on the 2016 release "Radio Free Europe" Live at BBC 2011. In summer of 2013, Saenz re-united with his old bandmates in Excel after 20 years. In 2014 Greg became drummer for John Garcia of Kyuss fame.

== Discography ==
See also: List of Excel demos

Year	Album	Band	Type	Credits	Label
1985	Welcome to Venice	Excel	Split album	Drums on "Enforcer" and "Conclusion"	Suicidal
1987	Thrasher Skate Rock 5: Born to Skate	Excel	Split album	Drums on "Insecurity"	High Speed
1987	Split Image	Excel	Studio album	Drums	Suicidal/Caroline
1989	The Joke's on You	Excel	Studio album	Drums	Caroline
1989	Extreme Aggression	Kreator	Studio album	Background vocals	Noise
1989	Live at the Nighttown, Rotterdam	Excel	Live album	Drums	Self-produced
1990	Live in Philadelphia-PA	Excel	Live album	Drums	Self-produced
1996	Lost My Brain!	Cyco Miko	Studio album	Drums	Epic
1996	Endless Bummer	My Head	Studio album	Drums	Capitol
2000	Mas Borracho	Infectious Grooves	Studio album	Drums on "The Beard"	Suicidal
2001	Friends & Family, Vol. 2	Suicidal Tendencies	Compilation album	Drums on "Chain of Hate" and "Ultra Drown"	Suicidal
2001	How To Win Friends And Influence People	The Dwarves	Studio album	Drums	Reptilian Records
2011	The Dwarves Are Born Again	The Dwarves	Studio album	Drums	Greedy Records
2019	John Garcia and the Band of Gold	John Garcia	Studio Album	Drums, co-writer	Napalm Records
