= Adam Siegel =

American musician

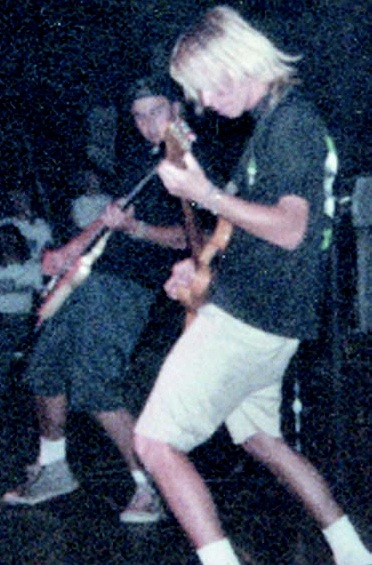
- Adam Siegel on stage with Excel on tour in Netherlands in 1989

Background information
- Also known as: Torg
- Born: March 9, 1969 (age 56)
- Origin: Venice, California, United States
- Genres: Heavy metal, crossover thrash, skate punk, funk metal, alternative rock, grunge, indie rock, glam rock, dance-rock, power pop
- Occupations: Musician, singer-songwriter, actor, producer, graphic designer
- Instruments: Guitar, bass
- Years active: 1983–present
- Labels: Suicidal (1985–1988; 2000); High Speed (1987); Caroline (1987–1989); Epic (1991–1994; 1996); Capitol (1996); DreamWorks (2001); E Works (2002); Middle Class Pig Records (2002;2004); Teenacide Records (2003); Secretly Canadian (2008–present)

Adam Siegel (born March 9, 1969) is an American singer-songwriter, guitarist, bassist, producer, actor and graphic designer (he has provided artwork and design for several releases by L.A. groups) from Venice, California, United States. Kiss, Black Sabbath, Sweet, Jimmy Page and the Sex Pistols are the musicians he cites as main influences.

He is a founding member of the crossover thrash band Excel, and subsequently was the lead guitarist for the Suicidal Tendencies side project, Infectious Grooves and the group Eagle, who became The Blondes after receiving a cease and desist letter from Don Henley's legal counsel. He founded the power trio My Head with Excel former drummer Greg Saenz and played the bass in the indie rock band Eels.

Between 2005 and 2007, he lived and worked as engineer and producer in the Glassell Park neighborhood of Los Angeles. Currently, he is the Music Go Music guitarist and sporadically works as producer. He appeared in the movies Encino Man and Zelimo.

== Career ==
Siegel was born and raised in Venice, California. At the age of 13 years he bought a guitar, and went to live with his cousin for a few months. There he met Dan Clements, who was living with his cousin. Dan recorded a tape to give to Adam and started talking about forming a band. The group was called "Chaotic Noise" with Evan Warech on drums and some temporary bassists during 1984, they played a lot of shows around L.A. with different bands of the same scene like No Mercy, Suicidal Tendencies, Beowülf and Cryptic Slaughter. They became very good friends of all those musicians and adopted each other as early influences. A few months later, Rickey Pallamino took over the four strings and Chaotic Noise recorded their first Demo. They also became close friends of a graffiti crew, Kings Stop at Nothing, specially with a boy called Shaun Ross, Adam and Dan learned to paint with him and included the graffiti in the style of the band. When Pallamino left Chaotic Noise, there was no one better than Shaun to replace him, then they changed their name to Excel, name that was created by Shaun Ross when he was in Kings Stop at Nothing. A few weeks later a new drummer joined the group: Greg Saenz. They recorded 3 more demos between 1985 and 1986 (Sonic Decapitation, Personal Onslaught and Refuse to Quit), editing their first studio album, Split Image in 1987 (the recording was paid by Mike Muir and distribution was conducted by Caroline Records), the second one, The Joke's on You in 1989, and a tour in Netherlands the same year with that line-up.

In 1990, Siegel left Excel to join (as lead guitarist) the Suicidal Tendencies side project, Infectious Grooves to record their first studio album: The Plague That Makes Your Booty Move...It's the Infectious Grooves. In 1992 he came back to Excel to record their fifth and final demo: Third album demos. The May 22 he appeared in the movie Encino Man with the Infectious Grooves. Then he definitely left Excel to form his own power trio (called My Head) with Greg Saenz on drums, the former Bad Radio member Dave Silva on bass and himself on guitar and lead vocals. However, this project was interrupted for Adam's participation in the second studio release by Infectious Grooves, Sarsippius' Ark, released in February 1993, and again in 1994 for their following album, Groove Family Cyco. On January 16, 1996, Siegel recorded various tracks for the first Mike Muir solo album: Lost My Brain! (Once Again). Then My Head signed a record contract with Capitol Records and released their first and only album Endless Bummer, the song "Humbucker" became their only single and music video. The sound of this album left the heavy metal music that Siegel had been playing earlier in Excel and Infectious Grooves to approach to styles more similar to alternative rock and grunge. The band broke up the January 1, 1998. Later that year, Siegel became the Eels bassist (this was the first time he played the bass on a group).

The song "Souljacker part I", performed with Siegel was included in the album Souljacker in 2001 and a live version in the live album Electro-Shock Blues Show, released in 2002. A few months later he created the band Eagle (who would become "The Blondes" in 2000) with Bill Dusha (ex-Sacred Hearts and Sexy Death Soda) on guitar and vocals, Jimmy James (ex-Coma-Tones and The mansons) on bass, Autumn de Wilde (also graphic designer and art director; her photography and paintings have been used for releases by Beachwood Sparks, Beck, Neal Casal, Eels, Lilys, Elliott Smith, and other artists) on keyboards and back vocals, Byron Maiden (ex-Possum Dixon and the Liquor Giants) on drums and himself on lead guitar and vocals. They did some shows around L.A. and suffered several line-up changes. In 2000 he returned for fourth and last time to Infectious Grooves to record their fourth studio album: Mas Borracho released the August 29.

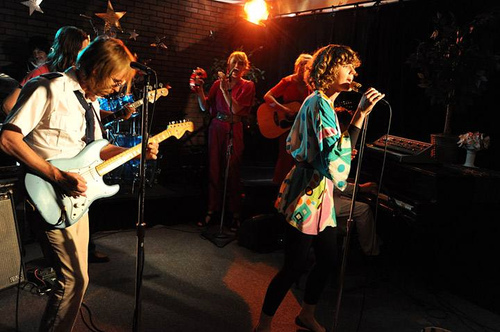
Adam Siegel (left) and Gala Bell in 2009.

After four years, The Blondes finally released their homonym first studio work with their original formation. In less than a half-year later they released their second official record, titled Swedish Heat. In 2004 they edited their third and final studio material, called Summer Strut, breaking up shortly after its tour. He retired as a musician in 2005 and became a producer and engineer in Glassell Park neighborhood of Los Angeles until 2008. Then he co-founded (as guitarist) Music Go Music, the dance-rock and power pop side-project to Meredith/Gala Bell (vocals) and David/Kamer (keyboards and vocals) Metcalf's band Bodies of Water, in which Siegel had participated in their second studio album "A Certain Feeling". In addition to these three members, the group is accompanied in concerts by various musicians who play several instruments. They came as long ago talking about writing something together, in May 2008, Siegel joined them to the studio to record their first single, "Light of Love" and a second one, titled "Warm in the Shadows " the January 20, 2009. In August 2008, they released an EP which included three tracks called Reach Out and he began using the nickname "Torg". The October 6, 2009, they edited their debut studio album: Expressions, as the two previous singles and the EP it was released by Secretly Canadian.

== Discography ==
See also: List of Excel demos

Year	Album	Band	Type	Credits	Label
1985	Welcome to Venice	Excel	Split album	Guitar on "Enforcer" and "Conclusion"	Suicidal
1987	Thrasher Skate Rock 5: Born to Skate	Excel	Split album	Guitar on "Insecurity"	High Speed
1987	Split Image	Excel	Studio album	Guitar	Suicidal/Caroline
1989	The Joke's on You	Excel	Studio album	Guitar	Caroline
1989	Live at the Nighttown, Rotterdam	Excel	Live album	Guitar	Self-produced
1990	Live in Philadelphia-PA	Excel	Live album	Guitar	Self-produced
1991	The Plague That Makes Your Booty Move...It's the Infectious Grooves	Infectious Grooves	Studio album	Guitar, artwork	Epic
1993	Sarsippius' Ark	Infectious Grooves	Studio album	Guitar	Epic
1994	Groove Family Cyco	Infectious Grooves	Studio album	Guitar, artwork	Epic
1996	Lost My Brain! (Once Again)	Cyco Miko	Studio album	Guitar, except tracks 1, 9 and 12, cover photography	Epic
1996	Endless Bummer	My Head	Studio album	Guitar, vocals, artwork	Capitol
2000	Mas Borracho	Infectious Grooves	Studio album	Guitar, keyboards, cover art	Suicidal
2001	Friends & Family, Vol. 2	Suicidal Tendencies	Compilation album	Guitar and vocals on "Chain of Hate" and "Ultra Drown", artwork	Suicidal
2001	Souljacker	Eels	Studio album	Bass guitar on Souljacker part I	DreamWorks
2002	Electro-Shock Blues Show	Eels	Live album	Bass guitar and backing vocals	E Works
2002	The Blondes	The Blondes	Studio album	Guitar, vocals	Middle Class Pig Records
2002	Summer Strut	The Blondes	Studio album	Producer, vocals, guitar, bass, keyboards, percussion	Middle Class Pig Records
2004	Swedish Heat	The Blondes	Studio album	Bass, engineer, guitar, producer, synthesizer, vocals	Teenacide
2008	A Certain Feeling	Bodies of Water	Studio album	Guitar, mixing	Secretly Canadian
2008	Reach Out	Music Go Music	EP	Guitar, bass, producer	Secretly Canadian
2009	Expressions	Music Go Music	Studio album	Guitar, bass, producer	Secretly Canadian

=== Other works (not as a musician) ===
Year	Album	Band	Type	Credits	Label
2007	Ears Will Pop & Eyes Will Blink	Bodies of Water	Studio album	Mixing	Secretly Canadian
2009	Yamerarena-i	Pixeltan	EP	Mixing	DFA Records
