= Enter Sandman =

1991 single by Metallica

Single by Metallica

from the album Metallica
- B-side: "Stone Cold Crazy"
- Released: July 29, 1991
- Recorded: June 16, 1991
- Studio: One on One (Los Angeles)
- Genre: Heavy metal; hard rock
- Length: 5:31
- Label: Elektra
- Composers: James Hetfield; Lars Ulrich; Kirk Hammett
- Lyricist: James Hetfield
- Producers: Bob Rock; James Hetfield; Lars Ulrich

Metallica singles chronology
"One" (1989)	"Enter Sandman" (1991)	"The Unforgiven" (1991)

Music video
- "Enter Sandman" on YouTube

"Enter Sandman" is a song by the American heavy metal band Metallica. It is the opening track and lead single from their self-titled fifth album, released in 1991. The music was written by Kirk Hammett, James Hetfield and Lars Ulrich. Vocalist and guitarist Hetfield wrote the lyrics, which deal with the concept of a child's nightmares.

The single reached number 16 on the US Billboard Hot 100 and achieved a nine-times platinum certification for more than 9,000,000 copies shipped in the United States, spurring sales of over 30 million copies for Metallica and propelling Metallica to worldwide popularity. Acclaimed by critics, the song is featured in all of Metallica's live albums and DVDs released after 1991 and has been played live at award ceremonies and benefit concerts.

== Writing and recording ==
"Enter Sandman"
Sample of "Enter Sandman" from Metallica's 1991 album Metallica. In this sample, the main riff of the song can be heard in the beginning followed by the verse and the pre-chorus. The whole song evolved from an early version of the main riff, written by guitarist Kirk Hammett.

"Enter Sandman" was the first song Metallica had written for their 1991 eponymous album. Metallica's songwriting at that time was done mainly by rhythm guitarist James Hetfield and drummer Lars Ulrich, after they gathered tapes of song ideas and concepts from the other members of the band, lead guitarist Kirk Hammett and bassist Jason Newsted. Ulrich's house in Berkeley, California, was used for this purpose. "Enter Sandman" evolved from a guitar riff that Hammett wrote, after being inspired by Soundgarden's 1989 album Louder Than Love. Originally, the riff was two bars in length, but Ulrich suggested the first bar be played three times and the second bar only be repeated every fourth time. The instrumental parts of the song were quickly finished, but Hetfield did not come up with vocal melodies and lyrics for a long time. The song was among the album's last to have lyrics, and the lyrics featured in the song are not the original; Hetfield felt that "Enter Sandman" sounded "catchy and kind of commercial" and so to counterbalance the sound, he wrote lyrics about "destroy[ing] the perfect family; a huge horrible secret in a family" that included references to crib death. For the first time in Metallica's history, however, Ulrich and producer Bob Rock told Hetfield that they felt he could write better lyrics. Nevertheless, according to Ulrich, the song was the "foundation, the guide to the whole record" even before it had lyrics.

An instrumental demo was recorded on August 13, 1990. The album Metallica was mostly recorded in Los Angeles at One on One Studios, between October 6, 1990, and June 16, 1991, although Ulrich, Hetfield, and Rock also recorded for a week in Vancouver, British Columbia, Canada, between April and May 1991. As the first to be produced by Bob Rock, it was recorded differently from previous Metallica albums; Rock suggested that the band members record in the studio while playing together, rather than separately.

"Enter Sandman" had what Hetfield described as a "wall of guitars"— three rhythm guitar tracks of the same riff played by himself to create a "wall of sound". According to engineer Randy Staub, close to 50 takes of the drums were recorded because Ulrich did not record the song in its entirety, but rather recorded each section of the song separately. Because it was difficult to get in one take the "intensity" that the band wanted, numerous takes were selected and edited together. Staub mentioned that the production team spent much time getting the best sound from each part of the room and used several combinations of 40 to 50 microphones in recording the drums and guitars to simulate the sound of a live concert. The bass guitar sound also gained importance with Rock; as Newsted states, Metallica's sound was previously "very guitar-oriented" and that "when he [Rock] came into the picture, bass frequencies also came into the picture." As the first single, "Enter Sandman" was also the first song to be mixed, a task that took roughly ten days because the band and Bob Rock had to create the sound for the entire album while mixing the song.

== Composition ==
The simpler songs in the album Metallica, including "Enter Sandman", are a departure from the band's previous, more musically complex album ...And Justice for All. Ulrich described "Enter Sandman" as a "one-riff song", in which all of its sections derive from the main riff credited to Kirk Hammett.

"Enter Sandman" moves at a tempo of 123 beats per minute for the song length of 5:32 which is slightly above the average song length of the album. It begins with a guitar intro using a chorus pedal similar to the main riff; an E minor chord on a guitar using the wah-wah pedal is then introduced, followed by heavy use of tom-tom drums. Distorted guitars then build up to the main riff, which starts 56 seconds into the song and utilizes variations of the E/B♭ tritone. P. J. Howorth, in The Wah Wah Book, characterized the main riff as "sinister". The song then follows a common structure, playing two iterations of a verse, a pre-chorus, and a chorus. On the chorus and pre-chorus, the song modulates one whole tone, up to F♯, and after the second chorus, Hammett plays a guitar solo with the main, pre-chorus, and chorus riffs in the background. Hammett makes use of the wah-wah pedal and a wide range of scales, including E minor pentatonic, B minor, F♯ minor, E minor, and the E dorian mode. One of the final licks of the solo was inspired by the Heart song "Magic Man" as used in Ice-T's "Personal". Just a few seconds before the solo ends, the breakdown starts, in which the clean drum intro starts, then the acoustic guitar intro when the last notes of Kirk's solo echo over it into the background, are heard together with Hetfield teaching a child the "Now I Lay Me Down to Sleep" bedtime prayer and reciting a variation of the lullaby rhyme "Hush Little Baby" where he is heard saying "Hush little baby don't say a word, and never mind that noise you heard. It's just the beasts under your bed, in your closet, in your head". After building again to a chorus, the song starts to fade out while the band plays the same riffs as the buildup intro in reverse order. Lyrically, the song is about "nightmares and all that come with them", according to Chris True of AllMusic. The title is a reference to the sandman, a character from Western folklore who makes children sleep.

== Release and reception ==
Initially, the song "Holier Than Thou" was slated to be the opening track and first single from Metallica; according to the documentary A Year and a Half in the Life of Metallica, producer Bob Rock told Ulrich and Hetfield that the album has "five or six songs that are going to be classics", not only with fans but also on the radio, and that "the first song that should come out is 'Holier Than Thou'". According to Rock, Ulrich was the only band member who felt, even before recording, that "Enter Sandman" was the ideal song to be the first single. Ulrich has said that there was a "big argument"; however, after explaining his point of view to the rest of the band, "Enter Sandman" eventually became the opening track and first single of the album.

The single was released on July 29, 1991, two weeks before the release of Metallica. The album debuted at No. 1 on the Billboard 200 in the United States and nine other countries, and sold over 30 million copies worldwide, allowing "Enter Sandman" to become, as Chris True describes it, "one of the most recognizable songs of all time in rock". The single peaked at No. 16 on the Billboard Hot 100 chart and at No. 5 on the UK Singles Chart. On September 30, 1991, it became Metallica's second single to achieve gold status in the United States, for shipping more than 500,000 copies. In August 2021, the song re-entered the German Singles Chart at No. 1 after a CD single was re-issued whose profit is set to be donated for charity benefitting the German survivors of the 2021 European floods. In addition to the nominations received by the album as a whole, the song was nominated for Best Rock Song at the 34th Grammy Awards in 1992, ultimately losing to "The Soul Cages" by Sting. It was also voted Song of the Year in Metal Edge's 1991 Readers Choice Awards.

"Enter Sandman" was met with acclaim by critics. Chris True of AllMusic declared it "one of Metallica's best moments" and a "burst of stadium level metal that, once away from the buildup intro, never lets up". According to him, the song's breakdown "brilliantly utilizes that 'Now I Lay Me Down to Sleep' bedtime prayer in such a way as to add to the scary movie aspect of the song". Steve Huey, in AllMusic's review of Metallica, described it as one of the album's best songs, with "crushing, stripped-down grooves". Robert Palmer of Rolling Stone described "Enter Sandman" as "possibly the first metal lullaby" and wrote that the song "tell[s] the tale" of the album's "detail and dynamic, [...] song structures and impact of individual tracks". Sid Smith from the BBC called the song "psycho-dramatic" and noted that the "terse motifs served notice that things were changing" with Metallica's new album. Blender magazine's Tim Grierson says that the lyrics "juxtapose childhood bedtime rituals and nightmarish imagery" and praises the "thick bottom end and propulsive riff".

"Enter Sandman" has received many accolades. Rolling Stone magazine listed it as the 408th song on their "500 Greatest Songs of All Time" list and 30th on their March 2023 "100 Greatest Heavy Metal Songs of All Time" list. VH1 placed it 22nd in their list of the "40 Greatest Metal Songs of All Time", 18th in their list of the "100 Greatest Songs of the '90s" and 88th in their 2003 list of "The 100 Greatest Songs from the Past 25 Years". Blender magazine included the song in their "The Greatest Songs Ever!" series of articles and placed it 65th on their list of "The 500 Greatest Songs Since You Were Born". Q magazine listed it 81st in their list of "The 100 Songs That Changed The World" and 55th in their list of "The 1001 Best Songs Ever". Total Guitar magazine readers chose the song's riff as the fifth greatest ever, while Kerrang! places it fourth on their list of the "100 Greatest Singles of All Time". The Rock and Roll Hall of Fame includes it in their list of the "500 Songs That Shaped Rock". It was also featured in Triple J's "Hottest 100 of All Time". In 2009, it was named the 5th greatest hard rock song of all time by VH1.

Since the song's release, there have been claims that the main riff was taken from the song "Tapping into the Emotional Void" by Excel. "Tapping into the Emotional Void" was released originally on their 1989 album The Joke's on You. In 2003, it was reported that Excel members were considering legal action against Metallica due to the similarities between the songs.

According to Nielsen Music's year-end report for 2019, "Enter Sandman" was the eighth most-played song of the decade on mainstream rock radio with 126,000 plays. All of the songs in the top 10 were from the 1990s.

== Music video ==
"Enter Sandman" was the second music video from Metallica and the first from Metallica. It was also the first of six Metallica music videos directed by Wayne Isham. Recorded in June 1991 in Los Angeles, it premiered on July 30, 1991, two weeks before the release of the album. The plot of the music video directly relates to the theme of the song, combining images of a child having nightmares and images of an old man with shots of the band playing the song. The child dreams that he is drowning, falling from the top of a building, covered in snakes, being chased by a truck and finally falling from a mountain while escaping the truck. During the part of the song in which the child recites a prayer, he is being watched by the old man. Throughout the video, the picture flickers continuously. The music video won Best Hard Rock Video at the 1992 MTV Video Music Awards and was nominated for Best Cinematography and Best Editing. Andrew Blackie of PopMatters has said the video's narrative "suits the sludgy riffs and James Hetfield's twisted lullaby lyric."

== Appearances and covers ==
"Enter Sandman" has been played in almost every Metallica live performance since its release. The band released live versions of the song in the videos Live Shit: Binge & Purge, Cunning Stunts, and S&M where the band played with the San Francisco Symphony led by maestro Michael Kamen. The song is discussed in the videos A Year and a Half in the Life of Metallica and Classic Albums: Metallica - Metallica, and its video is available in The Videos 1989–2004. Metallica has played the song live at awards ceremonies and benefit concerts, such as the 1991 MTV Video Music Awards, the 1992 Grammy Awards, the Freddie Mercury Tribute Concert, and Live Earth. Explosives are occasionally set off at 0:49 of the song, when the main riffs start. Following its UK terrestrial broadcast of Live Earth, the BBC received 413 complaints and apologized to Metallica fans for cutting the band's set before "Enter Sandman".

Motörhead covered "Enter Sandman" in 1998, and received a nomination for the Grammy Award for Best Metal Performance at the 42nd Annual Grammy Awards.

The song was also used by NASA mission control CAPCOM B. Alvin Drew to wake up space shuttle astronauts aboard STS-123. The song was selected for Mission Specialist Robert L. Behnken by his fiancé.

During the 2003 invasion of Iraq, uncooperative prisoners were exposed to the song for extended periods by American interrogators. According to United States Psychological Operations, the intention was to "break a prisoner's resistance [... by] playing music that was culturally offensive to them". Upon discovering that the song was used for these purposes, drummer Lars Ulrich commented saying "it all seems so bizarre and so strange that Metallica's music, which generally sort of facilitates bringing people together, is used in these bizarre circumstances. It's certainly not something that we in any way advocate or condone".

When Mariano Rivera was pitching for the New York Yankees, "Enter Sandman" was routinely used as his entrance music; Rivera himself was often nicknamed "Sandman".

"Enter Sandman" is used in the polka melody "Polka Your Eyes Out" for "Weird Al" Yankovic's 1992 album Off the Deep End. The song was also sampled by British electronic duo Utah Saints and American rapper Chuck D on their track "Power to the Beats". This was the first time that Metallica had cleared a sample of one of their songs.

The song is the "unofficial theme" of Virginia Tech's athletic program. It has been used as the entrance theme for the Hokies football team's home games at Lane Stadium since 2000. The custom was started when the stadium installed a new scoreboard, and the team debated between using Guns N' Roses' "Welcome to the Jungle" and the Alan Parsons Project's "Sirius" before selecting "Enter Sandman". The men's and women's basketball teams later adopted it for games at Cassell Coliseum; the latter also played the song on March 27, 2023, while celebrating their first trip to the Final Four. On May 7, 2025, the band performed live at Lane Stadium as part of their M72 World Tour; fans' jumping to "Enter Sandman" was so intense that it registered as a minor earthquake.

Since 2021, "Enter Sandman" has been used as entrance music for the Welsh Rugby Union and Premier League side Brentford FC during both sports teams walk-out onto the pitch. The same year, the song was covered by Weezer as part of The Metallica Blacklist.

Pro wrestler The Sandman used "Enter Sandman" as his entrance music throughout his time in Extreme Championship Wrestling and the independent circuit. It was also used by Brock Lesnar as an entrance song during five of his MMA fights in the UFC.

After converting the roller coaster X to X2 in 2008, Six Flags Magic Mountain included "Enter Sandman" as apart of the on-board soundtrack which can be heard going up the lift hill.

== Track listings ==
US single

1. "Enter Sandman" – 5:37
2. "Stone Cold Crazy" – 2:19

International CD single

1. "Enter Sandman" – 5:37
2. "Stone Cold Crazy" – 2:19
3. "Enter Sandman (Demo)" – 5:05

International 12-inch vinyl single (4 tracks)

1. "Enter Sandman" – 5:34
2. "Holier Than Thou (Work in Progress...)" – 3:48
3. "Stone Cold Crazy" – 2:17
4. "Enter Sandman (Demo)" – 5:05

International 12-inch vinyl single (3 tracks)

1. "Enter Sandman" – 5:34
2. "Stone Cold Crazy" – 2:17
3. "Enter Sandman (Demo)" – 5:05

International 7-inch vinyl single

1. "Enter Sandman" – 5:34
2. "Stone Cold Crazy" – 2:17

International 7-inch vinyl picture disc single

1. "Enter Sandman" – 5:34
2. "Stone Cold Crazy" – 2:17

Australian 2-track CD single

1. "Enter Sandman" – 5:37
2. "Stone Cold Crazy" – 2:19

Japanese 2-track 3-inch CD single

1. "Enter Sandman"
2. "Stone Cold Crazy"

== Personnel ==
Personnel are adapted from the Metallica liner notes, except where noted.

Metallica

- James Hetfield – guitars, vocals, production
- Lars Ulrich – drums, production
- Kirk Hammett – lead guitar
- Jason Newsted – bass

Additional Personnel

- Bob Rock's son – child talking
- Bob Rock – production
- Randy Staub – engineering
- Mike Tacci – assistant engineering

== Charts ==
=== Weekly charts ===
1991 weekly chart performance for "Enter Sandman"
Chart (1991)	Peak position
Australia (ARIA)	10
Belgium (Ultratop 50 Flanders)	45
Canada Retail Singles (The Record)	1
Canada Top Singles (RPM)	17
Denmark (IFPI)	4
Europe (Eurochart Hot 100)	8
Finland (Suomen virallinen lista)	1
Germany (GfK)	9
Ireland (IRMA)	4
Italy Airplay (Music & Media)	10
Netherlands (Dutch Top 40)	12
Netherlands (Single Top 100)	10
New Zealand (Recorded Music NZ)	8
Norway (VG-lista)	2
Sweden (Sverigetopplistan)	14
Switzerland (Schweizer Hitparade)	11
UK Singles (Official Charts)	5
US Billboard Hot 100	16
US Mainstream Rock (Billboard)	10
US Cash Box Top 100	28

2021 weekly chart performance for "Enter Sandman"
Chart (2021)	Peak position
Germany (GfK)	1

2025–2026 weekly chart performance for "Enter Sandman"
Chart (2025–2026)	Peak position
Global 200 (Billboard)	163

=== Year-end charts ===
Year-end chart performance for "Enter Sandman"
Chart (1991)	Position
Australia (ARIA)	50
Europe (Eurochart Hot 100)	82
Germany (Media Control)	77
Italy (Musica e dischi)	76
Netherlands (Dutch Top 40)	101
Netherlands (Single Top 100)	83
New Zealand (RIANZ)	41
Sweden (Topplistan)	72
US Album Rock Tracks (Billboard)	39

=== Decade-end charts ===
Decade-end chart performance for "Enter Sandman"
Chart (1990–1999)	Position
Canada (Nielsen SoundScan)	79

Chart (2010–2019)	Position
US Mainstream Rock (Nielsen Music)	8

== Certifications and sales ==
Certifications and sales for "Enter Sandman"
Region	Certification	Certified units/sales
Australia (ARIA)	11× Platinum	770,000^{‡}
Canada (Music Canada)	Gold	50,000^{^}
Denmark (IFPI Danmark)	2× Platinum	180,000^{‡}
France (SNEP)	Gold	100,000^{*}
Germany (BVMI)	Platinum	500,000^{‡}
Italy (FIMI) sales since 2009	Platinum	50,000^{‡}
New Zealand (RMNZ)	7× Platinum	210,000^{‡}
Spain (Promusicae)	Platinum	60,000^{‡}
United Kingdom (BPI)	3× Platinum	1,800,000^{‡}
United States (RIAA) Physical	Gold	500,000^{^}
United States (RIAA) Digital	9× Platinum	9,000,000^{‡}
Ringtone
Canada (Music Canada)	Gold	20,000^{*}
United States (RIAA)	Gold	500,000^{*}
^{*} Sales figures based on certification alone.^{^} Shipments figures based on certification alone.^{‡} Sales+streaming figures based on certification alone.

== See also ==
- List of highest-certified singles in Australia
