= Seeking Refuge =

Studio album by Excel
- Released: August 29, 1995
- Recorded: 1994–1995
- Genre: Funk metal, alternative metal, groove metal
- Label: Delicious Vinyl/Capitol

Excel chronology
The Joke's on You (1989)	Seeking Refuge (1995)

Singles from Seeking Refuge
- 1. "Unenslaved" Released: 1995

Seeking Refuge is the third studio album by Excel. It was released in 1995. Some of the material on this album dates back to 1991 when Excel began writing The Joke's on You's follow-up. Due to lineup changes and band members being involved in their own activities at the time, Seeking Refuge was set aside for a number of years before finally being completed in 1995. With this album, Excel once again presented a change in musical style, beginning to merge the thrash metal of The Joke's on You with funk music.

The only single off this album was "Unenslaved". Like other Excel albums, the album was out of print for a number of reasons; it was then announced in 2024 for a re-release.

== Track listing ==
1. "Unenslaved"
2. "Hair Like Christ"
3. "Plastic Cracks"
4. "Take Your Part Gotta Encourage"
5. "Drowned Out"
6. "United Naturally in True Youth"
7. "Riptide"
8. "Overview"
9. "Downpressor"

== Personnel ==
- Dan Clements - vocals
- Brandon Rudley - guitar
- Shaun Ross - bass
- Max - drums
