= My Head =

American grunge/alternative rock band

- My Head in 1996, L-R: Adam Siegel, Greg Saenz and Dave Silva

Background information
- Origin: Los Angeles, California, United States
- Genres: Grunge, alternative rock
- Years active: 1993–1998
- Label: Capitol (1996)
- Spinoff of: Excel
- Past members: Adam Siegel; Greg Saenz; Dave Silva

My Head was an American grunge/alternative rock power trio from Los Angeles, California, United States, formed in 1993 by singer-songwriter and guitarist Adam Siegel and drummer Greg Saenz. Due to its member's past on Excel, My Head's sound was influenced by early 1980s Crossover Thrash music, but also by the growing grunge movement inspired by bands like Nirvana, Pearl Jam and Soundgarden. Even after its dissolution My Head recorded three tracks for two different Mike Muir's releases: Pneumonia (EP later included on the album Mas Borracho by Infectious Grooves) and Friends & Family, Vol. 2 by Suicidal Tendencies.

== History ==
My Head was founded in early 1993 after Adam Siegel and Greg Saenz left Excel indefinitely and Dave Silva joined as bassist, but Adam's appearances on Infectious Grooves's albums repeatedly interrupted the progress of the project. It was not until 1994 that they landed a recording contract, however the label (Imago Records) went out of business eight months later. In 1995 the band had its second chance and signed a new contract with Capitol Records. Then they began playing at several clubs around Hollywood like Dragonfly, Martini Lounge, Spaceland, Bar DeLuxe, Opium Den and coffee houses. In 1996 My Head brought to market its first and only studio album Endless Bummer, the record consisted of twelve tracks and was released on CD and cassette. Saenz described the album as "a hard-hitting soul – rock, a 90's version of Grand Funk". Soon after My Head filmed a music video of the single Humbucker.

After some management changes, the firm started pushing the band to add new members, modify its image and even its name; to worsen the situation EMI began supporting nu metal bands more than anything else; in an interview Saenz said: "they were getting huge egos and bank accounts managing Korn, and hyping their new band, Limp Bizkit [...] then told us to add a D.J., another guitarist, and change our name to The Peking Logs". Due to these conflicts My Head broke the contract with Capitol and disbanded in 1998.

== Members ==
- Adam Siegel – guitar, lead vocals (1993–1998)
- Dave Silva – bass (1994–1998)
- Greg Saenz – drums (1993–1998)

== Discography ==
=== Endless Bummer ===
Endless Bummer is the first and only My Head studio album. The record was released the April 16, 1996 and released on Capitol Records. This album is notable for its heavy guitar riffs influenced by psychedelic and funk rock that allude to bands like Alice in Chains and Cream.

Professional ratings
Review scores
Source	Rating
Allmusic	link

Endless Bummer

Studio album by My Head
- Released: April 16, 1996
- Length: 43:27
- Label: Capitol
- Producer: Rob Schnapf

==== Track listing ====
No.	Title	Writer(s)	Length
1.	"Carnasaur"	Adam Siegel	4:14
2.	"Killer Hair"	Adam Siegel	3:25
3.	"Point of Wiev"	Adam Siegel, Greg Saenz, Dave Silva	3:51
4.	"Fall"	Adam Siegel	3:53
5.	"Humbucker"	Adam Siegel	4:21
6.	"Positive"	Adam Siegel, Dave Silva	3:25
7.	"Sonrisa"	Adam Siegel, Dave Silva	3:57
8.	"I Don't Want Nothing"	Adam Siegel, Dave Silva	2:49
9.	"Nesbitts"	Adam Siegel	2:16
10.	"Don't Waste My Time"	Adam Siegel, Dave Silva	3:41
11.	"Log"	Adam Siegel, Greg Saenz, Dave Silva	4:01
12.	"Teenage Foxes"	Adam Siegel	3:34
Total length:			43:27

==== Single ====
The only single taken from the album was the track "Humbucker". It was released on April 1, 1996. Later that month, My Head filmed the music video for this song at EMI studios; it later debuted on VH1.

=== Other appearances ===
Year	Album	Band	Type	Accredited songs	Label
2000	Pneumonia	Infectious Grooves	EP	The Beard	Suicidal
2001	Friends & Family, Vol. 2	Suicidal Tendencies	Compilation album	Chain of Hate and Ultra Down	Musicrama, Inc
