= The Joke's on You =

Studio album by Excel
- Released: June 20, 1989
- Recorded: April 1988–March 1989
- Studio: Music Grinder Studio, Hollywood, California; EQ Sound, Hollywood, California
- Genre: Crossover thrash, thrash metal
- Length: Vinyl version: 39:49; CD version: 43:13; 2001 re-release: 63:10
- Label: Caroline
- Producer: Randy Burns

Excel chronology
Split Image (1987)	The Joke's on You (1989)	Seeking Refuge (1995)

Professional ratings
Review scores
Source	Rating
Hi-Fi News & Record Review	B:3/A:1

The Joke's on You is the second album by Excel, released in 1989. This album saw the band mix their crossover thrash sound with influences coming from different genres, including punk, hip-hop, funk, doom metal and traditional thrash metal, and it is also driven by grooves, with Far Out calling the introduction to the track "Tapping into the Emotional Void" an early example of groove metal.

The Joke's on You is also the last Excel album recorded with two of the "classic" lineup members, Adam Siegel (guitar) and Greg Saenz (drums). Following their departure, Excel's music would take a different direction on their next album, 1995's Seeking Refuge.

== Commercial performance ==
Although The Joke's on You never reached any major charts, it is often considered Excel's best release, and it features their live staples "Fired (You're)", "Tapping into the Emotional Void", "Seeing Insane" and "My Thoughts". "Tapping into the Emotional Void" gained considerable attention years after its release, due to accusations that Metallica had plagiarized the opening riff to that song on their 1991 song "Enter Sandman", which had also resulted in Excel taking legal action.

== Availability ==
Two different covers of The Joke's on You exist: the original version featured a white cover and the 2001 re-release featured a black cover. Like many Excel albums, the recording is out of print, but this album, along with the band's others, can readily be found for sale on Chinese, Ukrainian, and Russian mp3 websites.

== Track listings ==
All songs by Excel, except "Message in a Bottle", originally by the Police.

=== Original release ===
==== Side one ====
1. "Drive" (2:27)
2. "Shadow Winds" (4:17)
3. "Fired (You're)" (3:16)
4. "Tapping into the Emotional Void" (4:20)
5. "Affection Blends with Resentment" (3:56)
6. "Seeing Insane" (3:18)

==== Side two ====
1. "My Thoughts" (3:19)
2. "I Never Denied" (5:19)
3. "Message in a Bottle" (2:51)
4. "Given Question" (3:53)
5. "The Stranger" (2:53)

=== CD version ===
1. "Drive" (2:27)
2. "Shadow Winds" (4:17)
3. "Fired (You're)" (3:16)
4. "Tapping into the Emotional Void" (4:20)
5. "Affection Blends with Resentment" (3:56)
6. "Seeing Insane" (3:18)
7. "My Thoughts" (3:19)
8. "I Never Denied" (5:19)
9. "Message in a Bottle" (2:51)
10. "Given Question" (3:53)
11. "The Stranger" (2:53)
12. "Blaze Some Hate" (3:24)

Track notes: The last track, "Blaze Some Hate", appears only on the original CD version as a bonus track.

=== 2001 re-issue ===
1. "Drive" (2:27)
2. "Shadow Winds" (4:17)
3. "Fired (You're)" (3:16)
4. "Tapping into the Emotional Void" (4:20)
5. "Affection Blends with Resentment" (3:56)
6. "Seeing Insane" (3:18)
7. "My Thoughts" (3:19)
8. "I Never Denied" (5:19)
9. "Message in a Bottle" (2:51)
10. "Given Question" (3:53)
11. "The Stranger" (2:53)
12. "Blaze Some Hate" (3:24)
13. "Cultured" (4:42)
14. "More Than You'd Ever Know" (3:49)
15. "Soul Sick" (3:46)
16. "Withdrawal" (3:58)
17. "Priorities Astray" (3:42)

Track notes: The last five unreleased tracks are demo tracks of later material. They were originally recorded in 1991 while Excel was planning their follow-up to this album.

== Personnel ==
- Dan Clements – lead vocals
- Adam Siegel – guitars, backing vocals
- Shaun Ross – bass guitar, backing vocals
- Greg Saenz – drums, backing vocals
