= Against (American band) =

American crossover thrash band, formed in 2006

AgainST
- Origin: Venice, California, United States
- Genres: Crossover thrash, thrash metal, punk rock
- Years active: 2006
- Labels: Built on an Ounce
- Members: Dan Clements; Kevin Guercio; Grant Estes; Louiche Mayorga; Amery Smith

Against (styled as AgainST) were an American crossover thrash band, formed in 2006 for the Welcome 2 Venice compilation by singer-songwriter Dan Clements, original Suicidal Tendencies members Grant Estes, Louiche Mayorga and Amery Smith and former No Mercy vocalist Kevin Guercio.

== History ==
In 2006, Louiche Mayorga started the compilation album project Welcome 2 Venice with other bands from Venice, California. Just a few days later he met by chance with Grant Estes and Amery Smith, he told them about the project and they instantaneously accepted to join it. Mayorga recorded some tapes and sent them to Dan Clements (Excel founding member and frontman) who called him that same night to form new band together. With the line-up complete, the band was called AgainST.

In May 2006, AgainST made two shows at The Good Hurt Club in Venice, both concerts were benefits to help launch the compilation album Welcome 2 Venice (disc which continues the previous compilation released in 1985, with songs by their original bands). At the time of going to the studio, Mayorga recruited Kevin Guercio (original No Mercy singer) as a second vocalist for the group. They recorded two tracks for Welcome 2 Venice: "Camarillo" (with Clements) and "Roll the Dice" (with Guercio). The entire recording, release and distribution was conducted by Louiche Mayorga's independent label, Built on an Ounce.

After the release of the album, there were rumors about a possible Excel reunion, however Clements said he had no intentions of reforming the band, and did not want anyone to take AgainST as a return of the group.

== Members ==
- Dan Clements – lead vocals
- Kevin Guercio – lead vocals
- Grant Estes – guitar
- Louiche Mayorga – bass
- Amery Smith – drums

== Discography ==
Year	Title	Label	Notes	Accredited songs
2006	Welcome 2 Venice	Built on an Ounce	Compilation	"Camarillo" and "Roll the Dice"
