= Eric Moore =

Eric Moore may refer to:

- Eric Moore (footballer, born 1925) (1925–2017), Australian rules footballer for Fitzroy
- Eric Moore (footballer, born 1948), Australian rules footballer for Richmond and South Melbourne
- Eric Moore (footballer, born 1926) (1926–2004), English football (soccer) player
- Eric Moore (defensive end) (born 1981), American football player for New York Giants, New Orleans Saints, St. Louis Rams, and New England Patriots
- Eric Moore (offensive lineman) (born 1965), American football player for New York Giants, Cincinnati Bengals, Cleveland Browns and Miami Dolphins
- Eric Moore (drummer), former drummer of King Gizzard & the Lizard Wizard
- Eric Moore, former drummer of Suicidal Tendencies
- Eric Moore, frontman of The Godz
