= Groove Family Cyco =

Groove Family Cyco / Snapped Lika Mutha

Studio album by Infectious Grooves
- Released: March 29, 1994
- Recorded: 1993
- Studio: Titan Studios, Sherman Oaks, Los Angeles, California; Sound City Studios, Los Angeles, California (drums)
- Genre: Funk metal
- Length: 41:15
- Label: 550 Music
- Producer: Michael Vail Blum, Infectious Grooves, Dhogcru

Infectious Grooves chronology
Sarsippius' Ark (1993)	Groove Family Cyco / Snapped Lika Mutha (1994)	Mas Borracho (2000)

Professional ratings
Review scores
Source	Rating
AllMusic	link

Groove Family Cyco / Snapped Lika Mutha is the third album by Infectious Grooves, a 1994 concept record about a family of crazy people (the 'Cycos'). The "Violent & Funky" music video appeared in Beavis and Butt-head.

== Recording ==
The album was recorded at Michael Vail Blum's Titan Studios in Sherman Oaks, Los Angeles, except the drums which were recorded at Sound City Studios. It was produced by Infectious Grooves and Michael Vail Blum, mixed by Paul Northfield at Larrabee Sound Studios, North Hollywood, and mastered by Brian Gardner at Bernie Grundman Mastering.

== Music and lyrics ==
"Do What I Tell Ya!" criticizes the band Rage Against the Machine, who are well known for expressing anti-corporate, left-wing politics in their lyrics, but are signed with Epic Records, a subsidiary of Sony, a Japanese multinational conglomerate corporation. Mike Muir later stated that Rage Against the Machine's guitarist, Tom Morello, provoked the feud by attacking Suicidal Tendencies. The song was written in 4/4, and takes a straight rock music approach, while the rest of the album combines elements of hard rock, funk and punk rock.

== Track listing ==
1. "Violent & Funky" (Muir, Pleasants, Siegel, Trujillo) – 4:19
2. "Boom Boom Boom" (Muir, Pleasants, Siegel, Trujillo) – 4:07
3. "Frustrated Again" (Muir, Trujillo) – 2:59
4. "Rules Go Out the Window" (Muir, Pleasants) – 4:27
5. "Groove Family Cyco" (Muir) – 4:19
6. "Die Lika Pig" (Muir, Siegel, Trujillo)– 3:14
7. "Do What I Tell Ya!" (Muir, Siegel) – 4:57
8. "Cousin Randy" (Muir, Trujillo) – 5:39
9. "Why?" (Muir, Siegel) – 4:00
10. "Made It" (Muir, Pleasants, Trujillo) – 4:32

== Credits ==
Sourced from the CD liner notes:

Infectious Grooves

- Mike Muir – vocals
- Robert Trujillo – bass
- Dean Pleasants – guitar
- Adam Siegel – guitar, artwork
- Brooks Wackerman – drums

Technical personnel

- Michael Vail Blum – Producer, Engineer
- Dhogcru – Executive Producer, Additional Production
- Paul Northfield – Mixing
- Brian "Big Bass" Gardner – Mastering at Bernie Grundman Mastering
- Kenny "Biscuit" Komisar – A&R Representation
- Dave Gottlieb – Product Manager
- Chris Cuffaro – Photography
- Zimbo – Art Direction

== Charts ==
Chart (1994)	Peak position
US Heatseekers Albums (Billboard)	19
