= Mas Borracho =

Studio album by Infectious Grooves
- Released: August 29, 2000
- Studios: Titan Studios, Sherman Oaks, Los Angeles, California
- Genre: Funk metal
- Length: 73:00
- Label: Suicidal
- Producers: Infectious Grooves, Michael Vail Blum

Infectious Grooves chronology
Groove Family Cyco (1994)	Mas Borracho (2000)

Professional ratings
Review scores
Source	Rating
AllMusic	4/5 stars
Rock Hard	4/10

Mas Borracho is the fourth album by Infectious Grooves, released in 2000. The title, as written on the album, is "but drunk" in Spanish. However, it is most likely a misspelling of "más borracho", meaning "more drunk" or "drunker".

== Recording ==
The album was recorded at Michael Vail Blum's Titan Studios in Sherman Oaks, Los Angeles, and mastered by Brian Gardner at Bernie Grundman Mastering.

The liner notes do not mention a producer, but credit Michael Vail Blum for engineering and mixing.

== Critical reception ==
The Sunday Herald Sun called the band "as technically perfect as any outfit", writing that the album contains "such perfect slow-funk tracks as 'Lock It In The Pocket' and 'Borracho'." Rock Hard wrote that "the music is as always: well played, pleasantly live-like and powerfully produced. But that doesn't hide the fact that Mike [Muir] and the like present us nothing more than boring funk-metal-rock with typically thin vocals."

== Track listing ==
All songs by Mike Muir and Dean Pleasants, except where noted.

1. "Citizen of the Nation" (Muir, Siegel, Pleasants, Trujillo) – 4:24
2. "Just a Lil Bit" (Muir, Siegel, Pleasants, Trujillo) – 3:38
3. "Lock It in the Pocket" (Muir, Siegel, Pleasants, Trujillo) – 3:36
4. "Good for Nothing" – 4:26
5. "Borracho" (Muir, Siegel, Pleasants, Trujillo) – 4:06
6. "Good Times Are out to Get You" – 3:14
7. "Wouldn't You Like to Know" (Muir, Siegel, Pleasants, Trujillo) – 2:55
8. "Going, Going, Gone" (Muir, Siegel, Pleasants, Trujillo) – 5:28
9. "21st Century Surf Odyssey" – 2:46
10. "Please Excuse This Funk Up" – 4:37
11. "Fill You Up" – 4:50
12. "What Goes Up" – 3:55
13. "Leave Me Alone" (Muir, Siegel, Pleasants, Trujillo) – 7:08
14. "I May Be Ugly (But I'm Feeling Fine)" – 3:10 Bonus track on Japanese edition

=== Pneumonia EP ===
14. Suicidal Tendencies – "Su Casa Es Mi Casa" (*) – 4:11
15. My Head – "The Beard" (*) – 3:41
16. No Mercy Fool! – "Choosin' My Own Way of Life" (*) – 2:43
17. Creeper – "Rollin' in the Rain" (*) – 4:57
18. Cyco Miko – "Strugglin'" (*) – 3:01

== Credits ==
Sourced from the CD liner notes:

Infectious Grooves

- Mike Muir – vocals
- Dean Pleasants – guitar
- Adam Siegel – guitar (tracks: 1 to 4, 6 to 9, 11, 13), keyboards (track: 10), artwork
- Robert Trujillo – bass guitar (tracks: 1 to 7, 9, 11, 13)
- Josh Paul – bass guitar (tracks: 6, 10, 12)
- Herman Jackson – keyboards (track: 12)
- Brooks Wackerman – drums (tracks: 1 to 4, 6 to 13)
- Josh Freese – drums (track: 5)

Production

- Michael Vail Blum – engineering, mixing
- Brian Gardner – mastering
- Steve Siegrist – art direction
