= Sarsippius' Ark =

Sarsippius' Ark (Limited Edition)

Studio album by Infectious Grooves
- Released: February 2, 1993
- Recorded: 1989 – April 18, 1992
- Venue: Universal Amphitheatre, Universal City, California ("Infectious Grooves", "Do the Sinister")
- Studio: Music Grinder, Hollywood, Los Angeles, California; Sony Studios, Santa Monica, California; Devonshire Sound Studios, North Hollywood, California ("Slo-Motion Slam", "Savor da Flavor")
- Genre: Funk metal
- Length: 56:32
- Label: Epic
- Producer: Mike Muir, Robert Trujillo, Paul Northfield, Tom Fletcher, Mark Dodson

Infectious Grooves chronology
The Plague That Makes Your Booty Move... It's the Infectious Grooves (1991)	Sarsippius' Ark (Limited Edition) (1993)	Groove Family Cyco (1994)

Sarsippius' Ark, also referred to as Sarsippius' Ark (Limited Edition), due to its cover, is the second album from Infectious Grooves and was released February 2, 1993. The album features various skits from Mike Muir as the character Sarsippius, the title character of the album.

The album reached number 109 on the Billboard 200 charts and number 1 on the Billboard Heatseekers charts that same year. Videos were made for "These Freaks Are Here to Party" and "Three Headed Mind Pollution".

== Recording ==
Most of the album was recorded at Music Grinder Studios in Hollywood and Sony Studios in Santa Monica, with producer Paul Northfield, and mixed at Skip Saylor Studios in Hollywood.

The songs "Three Headed Mind Pollution" and "These Freaks Are Here to Party" were recorded with producer Tom Fletcher, and partly mixed at One on One Studios in North Hollywood.

The live versions of "Infectious Grooves" and "Do the Sinister" were recorded at the Universal Amphitheatre on 18 April 1992 by Studio on Wheels, and mixed by Paul Northfield at Skip Saylor Studios.

"Slo-Motion Slam" and "Savor da Flavor" were recorded during The Plague That Makes Your Booty Move... It's the Infectious Grooves sessions at Devonshire Sound Studios with producer Mark Dodson. They feature that album's personnel: Scott Crago on drums, Stephen Perkins on percussion, and additional guitarists Phil Kettner and Christian Gaiters.

The demo versions of "Infectious Grooves" and "You Pick Me Up (Just to Throw Me Down)" were recorded to 8-track tape in 1989. "You Pick Me Up (Just to Throw Me Down)" is the demo version of "Therapy", highlighting Robert Trujillo's bassline. The demos were recorded with a lineup of Phil Kettner and Christian Gaiters on guitar, Dave Dunn on keyboards, and Sam Pokebo on drums.

Mike Muir and Robert Trujillo co-produced the album with Northfield, Fletcher, and Dodson. Josh Freese is credited as an additional musician in the liner notes, rather than a band member.

Professional ratings
Review scores
Source	Rating
AllMusic	4/5 stars

== Track listing ==
No.	Title	Writer(s)	Length
1.	"Intro"	Mike Muir/Sarsippius	0:41
2.	"Turtle Wax (Funkaholics Anonymous)"	Mike Muir, Robert Trujillo	3:30
3.	"No Cover/2 Drink Minimum"	Mike Muir/Sarsippius	0:46
4.	"Immigrant Song" (Led Zeppelin cover)	Jimmy Page, Robert Plant	2:57
5.	"Caca de Kick"	Mike Muir/Sarsippius	0:37
6.	"Don't Stop, Spread the Jam!"	Mike Muir, Robert Trujillo, Adam Siegel, Dean Pleasants	4:01
7.	"Three Headed Mind Pollution"	Mike Muir, Robert Trujillo	4:25
8.	"Slo-Motion Slam"	Mike Muir, Robert Trujillo	3:59
9.	"Legend in His Own Mind (Ladies Love 'sip)"	Mike Muir/Sarsippius	1:16
10.	"Infectious Grooves"	Dave Dunn, Mike Muir, Robert Trujillo	4:36
11.	"These Freaks Are Here to Party"	Mike Muir, Robert Trujillo	4:09
12.	"The Man Behind the Man"	Mike Muir/Sarsippius	0:39
13.	"Fame" (David Bowie Cover)	David Bowie, John Lennon, Carlos Alomar	4:36
14.	"Savor da Flavor"	Mike Muir, Robert Trujillo	3:53
15.	"No Budget/Dust off the 8-Track!"	Mike Muir/Sarsippius	0:40
16.	"Infectious Grooves (Demo)"	Dave Dunn, Mike Muir, Robert Trujillo	4:04
17.	"You Pick Me up (Just to Throw Me Down) "Therapy""	Mike Muir, Robert Trujillo	3:11
18.	"Do the Sinister (Live)"	Mike Muir, Robert Trujillo	5:22
19.	"Big Big Butt, by Infectiphibian"	Mike Muir/Sarsippius, Robert Trujillo	0:55
20.	"Spreck" (Unlisted)	Sarsippius, Infectious Grooves	2:34
Total length:			56:32

== Credits ==
Sourced from the CD liner notes:

Infectious Grooves

- Mike Muir – vocals, producer
- Robert Trujillo – bass, producer
- Dean Pleasants – guitar
- Adam Siegel – guitar, artwork

Additional musicians

- Josh Freese – drums
- Dave Dunn – keyboards on "Slo-Motion Slam"
- Phil Kettner – lead guitar on "Slo-Motion Slam", additional guitar parts on "Savor da Flavor", heavy guitars and solo on "Infectious Grooves (Demo)"
- Christian Gaiters – additional guitar parts on "Savor da Flavor", clean guitars on "Infectious Grooves (Demo)"
- Scott Crago – drums on "Slo-Motion Slam" and "Savor da Flavor"
- Stephen Perkins – percussion on "Slo-Motion Slam" and "Savor da Flavor"
- Sam Pokebo – drums on "Infectious Grooves (Demo)"

Technical personnel

- Paul Northfield – producer (tracks 2, 4, 6, 13, 20), mixing
- Tom Fletcher – producer (7, 11)
- Mark Dodson – producer (8, 14)

== Charts ==
Chart (1993)	Peak position
US Billboard 200	109
US Heatseekers Albums (Billboard)	1
