= 100 Greatest Songs from the Past 25 Years =

- Genre: Documentary
- Starring: Drea de Matteo
- Narrated by: TBA
- Country of origin: United States
- Original language: English
- No. of seasons: 1
- No. of episodes: 5

Production
- Executive producers: Robert Weiss; Bernie Kaminski
- Producer: Hilary Spiegelman
- Running time: 42 min.

Original release
- Network: VH1
- Release: June 16 – June 20, 2003

The "100 Greatest Songs from the Past 25 Years" was a list published by VH1 in 2003 to commemorate 25 years of iconic music since 1978. The list aimed to capture some of the most influential, popular, and enduring songs from 1978 to 2003. Hosted by Drea de Matteo.

== Commentators ==
- The Bangles
- Clive Davis
- Celine Dion
- Duran Duran
- Quincy Jones
- Darryl McDaniels
- Lisa Marie Presley
- Lionel Richie
- LeAnn Rimes
- Kelly Rowland
- Rob Sheffield
- Gwen Stefani

== List ==
Below is the top ten from the list.

1. "Smells Like Teen Spirit" by Nirvana
2. "Billie Jean" by Michael Jackson
3. "Sweet Child o' Mine" by Guns N' Roses
4. "Lose Yourself" by Eminem
5. "One" by U2
6. "Walk This Way" by Aerosmith and Run-DMC
7. "When Doves Cry" by Prince
8. "I Will Always Love You" by Whitney Houston
9. "Every Breath You Take" by The Police
10. "Like a Virgin" by Madonna
