= The Plague That Makes Your Booty Move... It's the Infectious Grooves =

Studio album by Infectious Grooves
- Released: October 9, 1991
- Recorded: 1991
- Studio: Devonshire Sound Studios, North Hollywood, Los Angeles, California
- Genre: Funk metal
- Length: 44:42
- Label: Epic
- Producer: Mark Dodson, Mike Muir, Robert Trujillo

Infectious Grooves chronology
The Plague That Makes Your Booty Move... It's the Infectious Grooves (1991)	Sarsippius' Ark (1993)

The Plague That Makes Your Booty Move... It's the Infectious Grooves is the debut album by Infectious Grooves, released in 1991. The song "Therapy" featured vocals from Ozzy Osbourne. The album introduces the character Sarsippius.

== Recording ==
The album was recorded at Devonshire Sound Studios in North Hollywood. It was produced by Mark Dodson with band founders Mike Muir and Robert Trujillo.

Ozzy Osbourne made a guest appearance on "Therapy", as he was recording No More Tears in the same studio as Infectious Grooves. Muir commented in a Songfacts interview in 2012:

But with Ozzy, when we were doing the record and first started recording it, the producer said, "What do you want to do on the chorus?" I said, "I actually think it would be really cool if Ozzy sang on it." And they're like, "Oh, give him a call." I'm like, "Dude, I don't know Ozzy." (laughing) He's like, "Oh, well why were you thinking that, then?" And I go, "Cuz I just listened to his songs and I've always got these videos in my head and I just thought it would be so cool, Ozzy, and it just stuck in my head." And then two days later, I came in the studio, and he goes, "Guess who just came in the studio next door?" And I'm like, "Who?" And he goes, "Ozzy." I'm like, "You serious?" And he goes, "Yeah, go talk to him." I'm going, "I'm not going to talk to him!" We went to lunch and we came back later and there he was in there. He goes, "You have a song you want me to do?" I'm like, "Uhhhhddduuuhhh." And he put the song on, and he's like, "I want to do it! I want to do it!" And it was really cool. So it's funny, 'cause after we did it at least like once or twice a day and in the evening, we hear this little knock or something and look and he'd be poking his head through and he's like, "'Scuse me, will you play that song for me again?" And he'd get in there and listen and start jumping and he goes, "I love it! I love it!" (laughing)

Three songs were left over from the sessions. "Feed the Monkey" was released as a promo CD, and included on the Encino Man soundtrack. The band also appeared in the movie, playing it during a prom scene. The other songs, "Slo-Motion Slam" and "Savor the Flavor", were released on Sarsippius' Ark.

The album's liner notes distinguish the guitarists' contributions between "clean guitar", "heavy guitar", and "lead guitar".

== Reception ==
Professional ratings
Review scores
Source	Rating
AllMusic	4/5 stars
Calgary Herald	B

Some of the songs received airplay on MTV, including "Therapy" and "Punk It Up". Steve Huey from AllMusic praised the album, calling it "an unabashed good-time party record". The album charted at 198 on the Billboard 200 and 6 on the Billboard Heatseekers.

== Track listing ==
1. "Punk It Up" (Muir/Trujillo) – 3:51
2. "Therapy" (Muir/Trujillo) – 3:25
3. "I Look Funny?" (Muir/Sarsippius) – 0:26
4. "Stop Funk'n with My Head" (Dunn/Muir/Trujillo) – 3:23
5. "I'm Gonna Be My King" (Dunn/Muir/Trujillo) – 5:23
6. "Closed Session" (Muir/Sarsippius) – 1:19
7. "Infectious Grooves" (Dunn/Muir/Trujillo) – 4:13
8. "Infectious Blues" (Muir/Trujillo) – 0:43
9. "Monster Skank" (Muir/Trujillo) – 3:42
10. "Back to the People" (Infectious Grooves) – 2:46
11. "Turn Your Head" (Muir/Sarsippius) – 1:19
12. "You Lie...And Yo Breath Stank" (Muir/Trujillo) – 2:55
13. "Do the Sinister" (Muir/Trujillo) – 4:15
14. "Mandatory Love Song" (Muir) – 0:09
15. "Infecto Groovalistic" (Muir/Trujillo) – 5:05
16. "Thanx But No Thanx" (Muir/Sarsippius) – 1:54

== Personnel ==
Sourced from the CD liner notes:

Infectious Grooves

- Mike Muir – vocals, guitar on "Punk It Up" (credited as "Heavy Guitars"), producer
- Robert Trujillo – bass, slide guitar on "Infectious Blues", producer
- Dean Pleasants – guitar (credited as "Clean Guitar"), lead guitar on "You Lie...And Yo Breath Stank"
- Adam Siegel – guitar (credited as "Heavy Guitars, Leads"), artwork
- Scott Crago – drums, percussion, congas on "Back to the People" and "Infecto Groovalistic"
- Stephen Perkins – percussion, drums on "Punk It Up" and "Infectious Grooves", timbales etc. on "Back to the People"
- Dave Dunn – keyboards

Additional musicians

- Phil Kettner – guitar (credited as "Lead Guitar & Parts") on "Infectious Grooves", additional guitar parts on "Infecto Groovalistic"
- Christian Gaiters – guitar (credited as "Clean Guitar & Parts") on "Stop Funk'n with My Head" and "Infectious Grooves"
- Dave Kushner – guitar solo on "Punk it Up"
- Rocky George – guitar
- Ozzy Osbourne – vocals on "Therapy"

The Groovalistic All-Star Back-Up Choir

- Mike "Milk Bone" Jensen, Stephen Perkins, Robert Trujillo, Dean Pleasants, Allan "Mac" Eisenhart, Brad Davis, Nina, Scott Crago, Dave Kushner, Bobby Fernandez, D.J., Joe Slaby, Pam Wiedmann, Roger, Aladin "Sarsippius" Sulemanagic – backing vocals

Technical personnel

- Mark Dodson – producer, engineer, mixing
- Kenny Komisar – executive producer
- Randy Long – engineer at Devonshire Sound Studios
- Greg Calbi – mastering
- Joel Zimmerman – art direction

== Charts ==
Chart (1991)	Peak position
US Billboard 200	198
US Heatseekers Albums (Billboard)	6
