= Eric Moore (footballer, born 1926) =

English footballer

Personal information
- Date of birth: 16 July 1926
- Place of birth: St Helens, England
- Date of death: 5 August 2004 (aged 78)
- Place of death: St Helens, England
- Position: Full back

Senior career*
Years	Team	Apps	(Gls)
1949–1957	Everton	171	(0)
1957	Chesterfield	6	(0)
1957–1958	Tranmere Rovers	36	(0)
Total		213	(0)
- * Club domestic league appearances and goals

Eric Moore (16 July 1926 – 5 August 2004) was an English footballer who played as a full back in the Football League for Everton, Chesterfield and Tranmere Rovers.
