= Split Image (album) =

Studio album by Excel
- Released: July 1987
- Recorded: April 1987
- Genre: Crossover thrash
- Length: 34:02
- Label: Caroline
- Producer: Randy Burns

Excel chronology
| Thrasher Skate Rock 5: Born to Skate (1987) | Split Image (1987) | The Joke's on You (1989) |

Split Image is the debut album by Excel, released in 1987. It is the band's first album as Welcome to Venice is a compilation album with Suicidal Tendencies, Beowülf, No Mercy and Los Cycos. Compared to their later works, this album sees Excel play thrash metal with hardcore punk and doom metal influences.

== Track listing ==
1. "Your Life, My Life" – 3:17
2. "Insecurity" – 2:12
3. "Split Image" – 5:12
4. "Never Look Away" – 3:41
5. "Wreck Your World" – 2:54
6. "Social Security" – 2:36
7. "Set Yourself Apart" – 2:22
8. "The Joke's on You" – 2:46
9. "Looking for You" – 2:58
10. "Spare the Pain" – 5:15

2000 re-release bonus tracks:

11. "Sonic Decapitation"
12. "No Deal"
13. "Split Image"
14. "Insecurity"
15. "Looking for You"
16. "Spare the Pain"
17. "Gods of Power"
18. "Blitz & Confinement"
19. "Enforcer"
20. "Conclusion"
21. "Make Up Your Mind"

== Personnel ==
- Dan Clements – vocals
- Adam Siegel – guitars
- Shaun Ross – bass guitar
- Greg Saenz – drums
