= Infectious Grooves =

American funk metal band

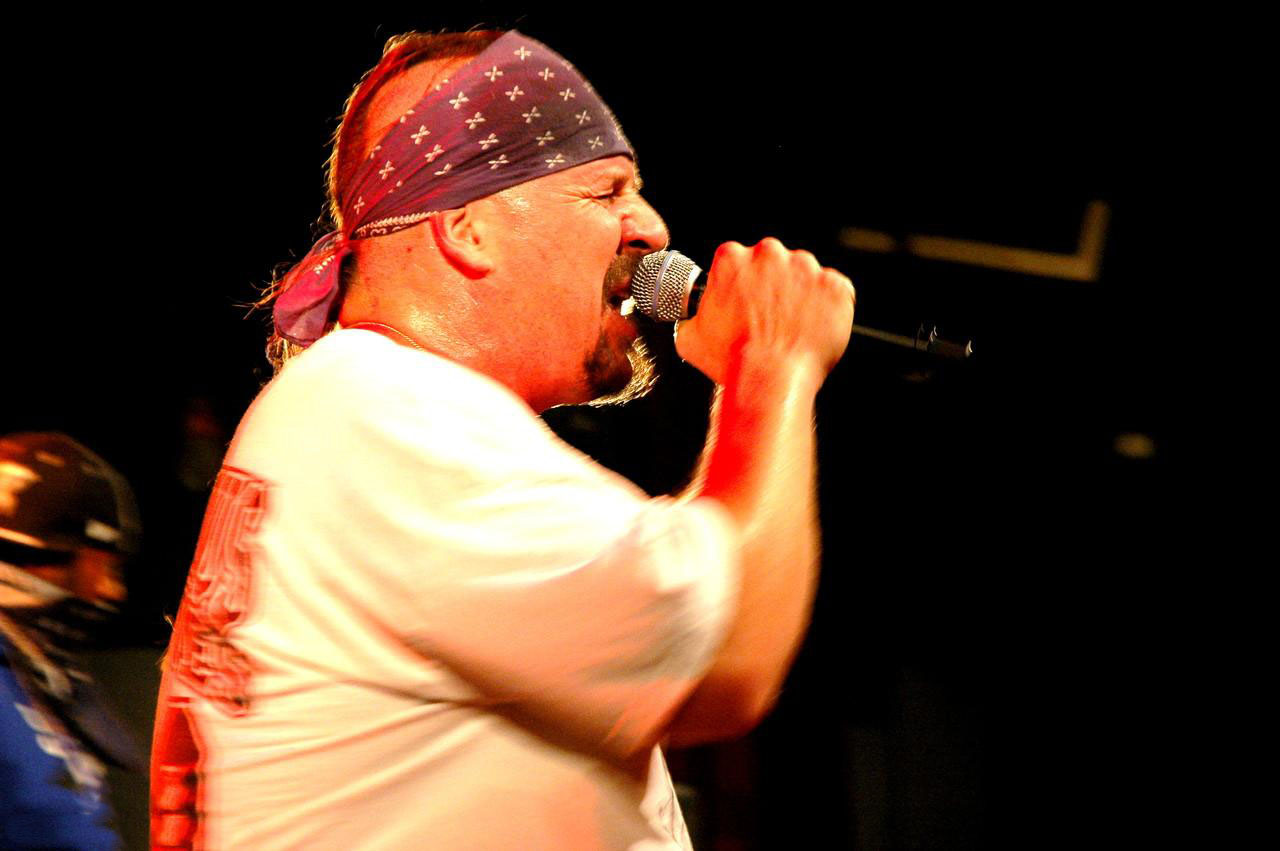
- Frontman Mike Muir

Background information
- Origin: Venice, Los Angeles, California, U.S.
- Genre: Funk metal
- Years active: 1989–2000; 2008–present
- Labels: Epic; Suicidal; 550 Music
- Spinoff of: Suicidal Tendencies
- Members: Mike Muir; Dean Pleasants; Robert Trujillo; Dave Kushner; Jay Weinberg
- Past members: Brooks Wackerman; Adam Siegel; Stephen Perkins

Infectious Grooves is an American funk metal supergroup led by vocalist Mike Muir and initially a side project from his group Suicidal Tendencies. The current lineup also includes guitarists Dean Pleasants and Dave Kushner, bassist Robert Trujillo, and drummer Jay Weinberg. To date, the project released four albums between 1991 and 2000.

Muir and the band appear in the 1992 film Encino Man, playing the song "Feed The Monkey" during the film's prom scene finale.

Though Muir's sense of humor was often obvious with Suicidal Tendencies, Infectious Grooves often brought out a goofier type of humor, incorporating comedy skits involving an anthropomorphic reptile named Sarsippius. A mascot costume of Sarsippius was later created and often appeared during the band's live performances.

The Infectious Grooves were on hiatus between the release of their fourth album, 2000's Mas Borracho, and 2007, while the band's personnel were busy with other projects. According to Muir, Infectious Grooves had been working on new material. In April 2008 the band began a one-month tour across Europe, featuring Stephen Bruner on bass, Eric Moore on drums, Dean Pleasants, and Tim Stewart on guitars.

Most of the band's original lineup reunited for the Orion Music + More festival in June 2013, with ex-Faith No More guitarist Jim Martin filling in for Adam Siegel.

The band toured in 2024 with Dave Kushner on guitar and Jay Weinberg on drums. At the time, Weinberg filled in for Wackerman during his assignment with Avenged Sevenfold. Wackerman joined that band on November 4, 2015, replacing Arin Ilejay.

== Band members ==
=== Current ===
- Mike Muir – vocals (1989–present)
- Dean Pleasants – lead guitar (1989–present)
- Robert Trujillo – bass (1989–2007 / 2013-present)
- Dave Kushner – rhythm guitar (2024–present; session 1991)
- Brooks Wackerman – drums (1993–2007 / 2013-2024 / present)

=== Former ===
- Adam Siegel – rhythm guitar (1989–2024)
- Stephen Perkins – drums (1989–1992)
- Jay Weinberg – drums (2024–2026)
- Thundercat - bass (2007-2011)
- Josh Paul - bass (1997-2000)
- Eric Moore - Drums (2007-2013)
- Tim Stewart - Guitars (2007-2014)
- Dave Nassie - Guitars (1995-1997)

=== Touring ===
- Jim Martin – rhythm guitar (2013)

== Discography ==
Year	Title	Label	US Billboard peak	Format	Other information
1991	The Plague That Makes Your Booty Move... It's the Infectious Grooves	Epic	198	CD	Debut album; The second track, "Therapy", features backing vocals by Ozzy Osbourne.
1993	Sarsippius' Ark	Epic	109	CD	
1993	The Great Infectious Cover-Up	Epic	Uncharted	CD	This was a promo CD containing covers of "Immigrant Song" by Led Zeppelin and "Fame" by David Bowie.
1994	Groove Family Cyco	Epic	Uncharted	CD	
1997	Friends & Family, Vol. 1	Suicidal	Uncharted	CD	Compilation featuring three IG tracks
1999	Cyco Miko - Schizophrenic Born Again Problem Child	Suicidal	Uncharted	CD	Compilation featuring two IG tracks and two 'Suicidal Grooves' tracks
2000	Mas Borracho	Suicidal	Uncharted	CD	
2001	Friends & Family, Vol. 2	Suicidal	Uncharted	CD	Compilation featuring three IG tracks
2008	Year of the Cycos	Suicidal	Uncharted	CD	Compilation featuring three IG tracks
2020	Take U on a Ride (EP)		Uncharted	EP	
