= Funk metal =

Music genre

- Stylistic origins: Funk rock; heavy metal; alternative metal; thrash metal
- Cultural origins: Mid-1980s, California, United States
- Derivative forms: Nu metal; rap metal

Regional scenes
- California

Local scenes
- San Francisco, California

Other topics
- Groove metal; punk funk

Funk metal (also known as thrash-funk) is a subgenre of funk rock and alternative metal that infuses heavy metal music (often thrash metal) with elements of funk and punk rock. Funk metal was part of the alternative metal movement, and has been described as a "brief but extremely media-hyped stylistic fad".

The funk metal scene formed in California during the mid-1980s with a group of bands who were initially playing a mix of funk, hard rock, hip-hop and punk; the genre quickly evolved to include elements of thrash metal.

== Characteristics ==
Funk metal has also been called thrash-funk or punk-funk. It was most prevalent in the American state of California, particularly in Los Angeles and San Francisco. According to AllMusic, funk metal "takes the loud guitars and riffs of heavy metal and melds them to the popping bass lines and syncopated rhythms of funk". They go on to state "funk metal evolved in the mid-'80s when alternative bands like the Red Hot Chili Peppers and Fishbone began playing the hybrid with a stronger funk underpinning than metal. The bands that followed relied more on metal than funk, though they retained the wild bass lines." Faith No More, another Californian alternative group who emerged in the mid-1980s, has been described as a funk metal band that also dabbled in rap metal. Rage Against the Machine's mix of funk and metal not only included rap, but also elements of hardcore. AllMusic formerly categorized funk metal as a style of alternative rock, in spite of the genre's name. The website currently categorizes it as a style of heavy metal.

Certain bands not from a punk/alternative background, such as glam metal groups Bang Tango and Extreme, have also frequently incorporated funk into their musical style. Bands such as Primus and Mordred emerged from the thrash metal underground.

In his book Know Your Enemy: The Story of Rage Against the Machine, Joel McIver wrote that funk metal is "a slightly clumsy term applied in the late eighties to any rock band whose bass player used a slapping style." He goes on to write "The best known funk-metallers were the Red Hot Chili Peppers (who later achieved global success with a more pop-oriented approach) and Living Colour. Other funk-metallers ranged from the credible, such as Infectious Grooves (a side-project of crossover thrash band Suicidal Tendencies), to the relatively obscure, such as the Dan Reed Network."

Roy Shuker described the genre in his 1994 book Understanding Popular Music, writing: "the 'classic' distinction between rock and pop [runs] into some difficulties when we consider various forms of 'alternative' music, illustrating the difficulties of forcing genres into too rigid a typology. For example, where would we place the wild musical genre called 'thrash funk', a fusion of 1970s funk, punk rock, rap, California surf, skateboard and hippy cultures, which, according to press reports, swept San Francisco clubs in 1990." Shuker wrote about the genre again in the 2005 edition of his book Popular Music: The Key Concepts, calling it "less structured than earlier forms of metal, with the bass guitar relied on more than the lead."

The genre managed to gain some international popularity through foreign acts such as British groups Atom Seed and Scat Opera, as well as Super Junky Monkey, an all-female funk metal/avant-garde band from Japan. Although never breaking through in the United States, Swedish band Electric Boys attracted recognition throughout Europe, with AllMusic calling them one of the "most celebrated purveyors of the short-lived funk-metal phenomenon."

Funk metal's prevalence in the late 1980s and 1990–91 predated the rise of grunge music in late 1991, which hurt the popularity of more traditional forms of hard rock/metal. In a January 1991 Spin article, Electric Boys singer Conny Bloom claimed funk metal had become a trend since people thought other hard rock of that era was "boring".

== History ==
=== Origins (early–mid 1980s) ===
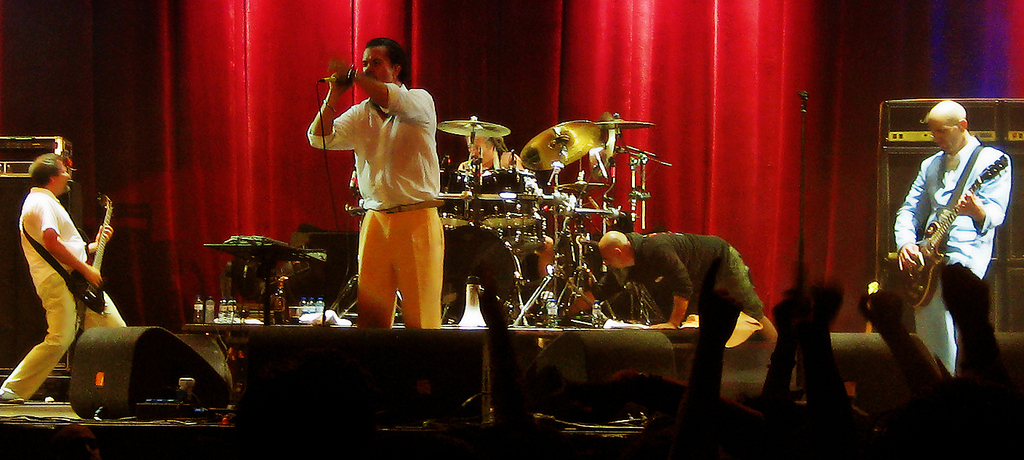
Funk metal band Faith No More

The roots of funk metal can be traced back to the Atlanta band Mother's Finest. In the late 1970s, the band already trying to make the leap from the classic funk rock of their Epic Records label to a more powerful sound. This can be heard in the song "Hard Rock Lover", which features a heavier rhythm section made up of bassist Jerry "Wizzard" Seay and drummer "B.B. Queen" Borden. It would be in 1981 when they could finally make the complete transition in their album Iron Age, an authentic mixture of heavy rock and funk that establishes the elements of origin for funk metal. The decision to take that direction towards heavy metal had some consequences, such as the departure of keyboardist Michael Keck, who could not find a place in that new sound. The album was produced by Jeff Glixman, who also worked with bands like Black Sabbath (for whom Mother's Finest opened for on their Technical Ecstasy Tour), Saxon, Magnum or Kansas. According to Alex Henderson of AllMusic, "with the right promotion, Iron Age could have made MF a big hit with the Quiet Riot/Judas Priest/Scorpions crowd, but the album was a commercial flop instead of the big commercial breakthrough that it should have been".

The self-titled 1984 debut album from Los Angeles band Red Hot Chili Peppers has been cited by some as the first truly funk metal or punk-funk release. Unlike with earlier funk rock albums from the 1970s and the early 1980s, it included elements of both punk and hip-hop. At that point, the band were already signed to the major label Capitol Records. Faith No More released their independent debut We Care a Lot the following year. Like with the Red Hot Chili Peppers' debut, it also mixed funk, hip-hop and punk music. While Faith No More originated from San Francisco's punk scene of the early 1980s, their guitarist Jim Martin was connected to the city's thrash metal scene, adding heavier influences to the band's sound. According to Louder Sound, Faith No More, Fishbone and Red Hot Chili Peppers "pre-dated the funk metal gold rush" of the very late 1980s and early 1990s, when major labels began signing bands associated with the sound. In 1988, Neil Perry of Sounds Magazine referred to Faith No More's 1987 major label debut Introduce Yourself as "a breathtaking harmonisation of molten metal guitar, deadly dance rhythms and poignant, pointed lyrics". On the Red Hot Chili Peppers' album The Uplift Mofo Party Plan, released the same year, guitarist Hillel Slovak started to experiment with sounds other than punk rock/hard rock, including thrash metal. During late 1987, Faith No More and the Red Hot Chili Peppers toured together in support of these two albums. Martin recalled: "We were travelling in a box van with no windows. We drove all the way to the east coast for the first show. Flea asked me if we liked to smoke weed. I said: ‘Yes’ and he said: ‘We're going to get along just fine’. We did something like 52 dates in 56 days." Faith No More subsequently went on a solo tour of the United Kingdom in 1988. Following this tour, their singer Chuck Mosley was fired due to his increasingly erratic behavior.

New York band Living Colour, who entered the mainstream during the late 1980s, were named by Rolling Stone as "black funk metal pioneers." Ska-influenced Los Angeles band Fishbone are also noted for being an all-black group. They had ties with the Red Hot Chili Peppers and have been labelled as early leaders of the funk metal/punk-funk movement. The band got signed to the major label Columbia Records in 1983, releasing several albums through them, but never had a significant hit song. Entertainment Weekly noted in a May 1991 article that "despite the rise of black rockers like Living Colour, the American funk-metal scene is predominantly white." Many reviewers often cited Living Colour as having been a band that were directly inspired by the Red Hot Chili Peppers. The vocalist of the Red Hot Chili Peppers, Anthony Kiedis, played down similarities between the two bands. He stated at the time, "Living Colour to me sounds nothing like Red Hot Chili Peppers. But I have to deal with [this] on a daily basis: 'Wow, Living Colour's really biting your style. Y'ever see the guy on stage? He moves just like you.'" The A.V. Club later wrote in 2013 that, "Living Colour was boundary-breaking—and yet the group was given more boundaries right out of the gate. As funk-metal like that of Faith No More solidified into a subgenre with set rules and sounds, the last thing Living Colour wanted was to be called funk-metal."

Primus, a band with thrash metal origins formed in the mid-1980s, has been widely described as funk metal, though they have also crossed many other genres and bandleader/bassist Les Claypool dislikes the categorization. After getting signed to Interscope Records, Claypool remarked in 1991, "We've been lumped in with the funk metal thing just about everywhere. I guess people just have to categorise you". Claypool has mentioned being inspired by The Uplift Mofo Party Plan, comparing it to Led Zeppelin.

=== Popularity (late 1980s–early 1990s) ===
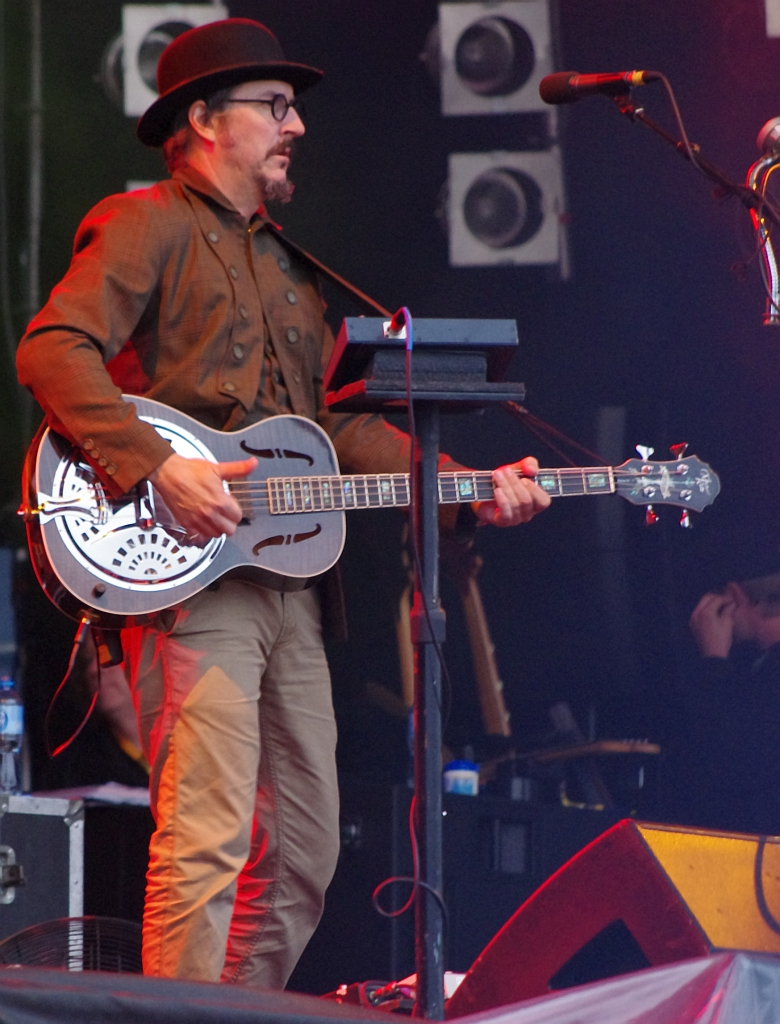
Les Claypool of Primus

The success of Faith No More's 1989 song "Epic" helped heighten interest in the genre. Funk metal band Living Colour also achieved mainstream success with their song "Cult of Personality", which was a very popular hit and frequently played on MTV, helping the band's album Vivid go double-platinum. In the wake of Living Colour's success, another all-black funk metal band from New York called 24-7 Spyz gained popularity. Anthony Kiedis later claimed Faith No More's new singer, Mike Patton, had stolen his style, specifically in "Epic" and its popular music video. He said "I watched [their] 'Epic' video, and I see him jumping up and down, rapping, and it looked like I was looking in a mirror." Since the Red Hot Chili Peppers had not yet broken outside of America, he believed European audiences would view him as being an imitator of Patton. The LA Weekly state: "Faith No More, then led by vocalist Chuck Mosley, before Patton joined the band, used to open for the similarly progressive Peppers just as the funk-metal scene was gaining momentum. By 1989, as both bands were getting exceedingly popular, they both landed European tours, with Faith No More’s scheduled to begin a few months before RHCP's. This wasn’t an issue, until Kiedis saw the video for FNM’s 'Epic'". In an interview with Kerrang! Kiedis further said, "what a drag if people get the idea that I’m actually ripping him off. Especially in the UK where FNM is much better known than us. In America, it’s a different story, people are aware of the profound influence we had on them." He also threatened to "kidnap [Patton], shave his hair off and cut off one of his feet just so he'll be forced to find a style of his own."

Faith No More's keyboardist Roddy Bottum responded to Kiedis by saying in an interview, "to me, our band sounds nothing like Red Hot Chili Peppers. If you're talking about long hair, rapping with his shirt off, then yeah, I can see similarities [...] I haven't talked to them since this whole thing started." Patton addressed Kiedis' allegations in 1990 by saying to Faces Magazine that, "it just kind of came out of the blue. It doesn't bother me a bit. I got a real big kick out of it to tell you the truth. I mean, if he's gonna talk about me in interviews, that's fine - it's free press! Either he's feeling inadequate or old or I don't know, but I have no reason to talk shit about him." Kiedis and Patton were thought to have gotten on good terms with each other after face to face encounters in the 1990s, although the feud would eventually continue into the late 1990s and early 2000s with Patton's other funk metal band, Mr. Bungle, who were heavily inspired by the Red Hot Chili Peppers in their early days.

The movement had reached a critical and commercial peak in 1991, with albums such as Blood Sugar Sex Magik (by Red Hot Chili Peppers), Sailing the Seas of Cheese (by Primus) and Mr. Bungle's self-titled debut attaining acclaim from the music press. Blood Sugar Sex Magik eventually went 7× platinum in the United States. Mark Jenkins of The Washington Post claimed in a 1991 article that "much of it sounds like art rock". Mr. Bungle initially began as a death metal band in Eureka, California with their 1986 demo The Raging Wrath of the Easter Bunny. On their subsequent 1980s demos Bowel of Chiley, Goddamnit I Love America! and OU818 they shifted to a ska-influenced funk metal sound. They signed to Warner Bros. Records in 1990 on the back of singer Mike Patton's success with Faith No More, and by then had started mixing their ska/funk metal style with avant-garde sounds. Their 1991 debut on Warner Bros. has been labelled as "funk metal madness" and "an irresistibly vulgar fusion of jazz, funk, metal, and a great wealth of other things." Regarding Mr. Bungle's evolution during the 1980s and early 1990s, guitarist Trey Spruance said, "[we were interested in] Slayer and Mercyful Fate. Later it was The Specials and Fishbone. Then we moved to San Francisco and got all sophisticated. Now we are improv snobs who rule the avant-garde universe by night, and poor, fucked-up hipsters by day." Spruance has mentioned the first two Red Hot Chili Peppers albums as an influence, with Mr. Bungle even covering their song "Baby Appeal" at a high school talent show. However, bassist Trevor Dunn has since claimed that he wasn't as big a fan of them as other members in the band were, saying "I was way more into Fishbone and Bad Manners back in the day."

In January 1991, Spin observed that major labels were seeking out bands with a "thrash-funk" or "funk metal" sound, and commented, "all of a sudden there's a virtual army of funk-metal bands, primarily centered in the San Francisco Bay Area. They range from thrashers, who lend an occasional funk edge to some of their material (Mordred and Death Angel) to straight-out funkers (Primus, Psychefunkapus and Limbomaniacs) to those who defy categorization (Faith No More)." Spin considered Limbomaniacs to be the most "rap-oriented" of the bands in the Bay Area scene. Trey Spruance notes that when living in San Francisco, Mr. Bungle played at "officially funk-metal functions" such as the Funk Fest, but he claims there wasn't as coherent a scene in the city as was being reported in the media. According to him, Mr. Bungle generally kept their separate ways from Faith No More, despite sharing the same singer, and neither Faith No More nor Mr. Bungle were particularly close with Primus.

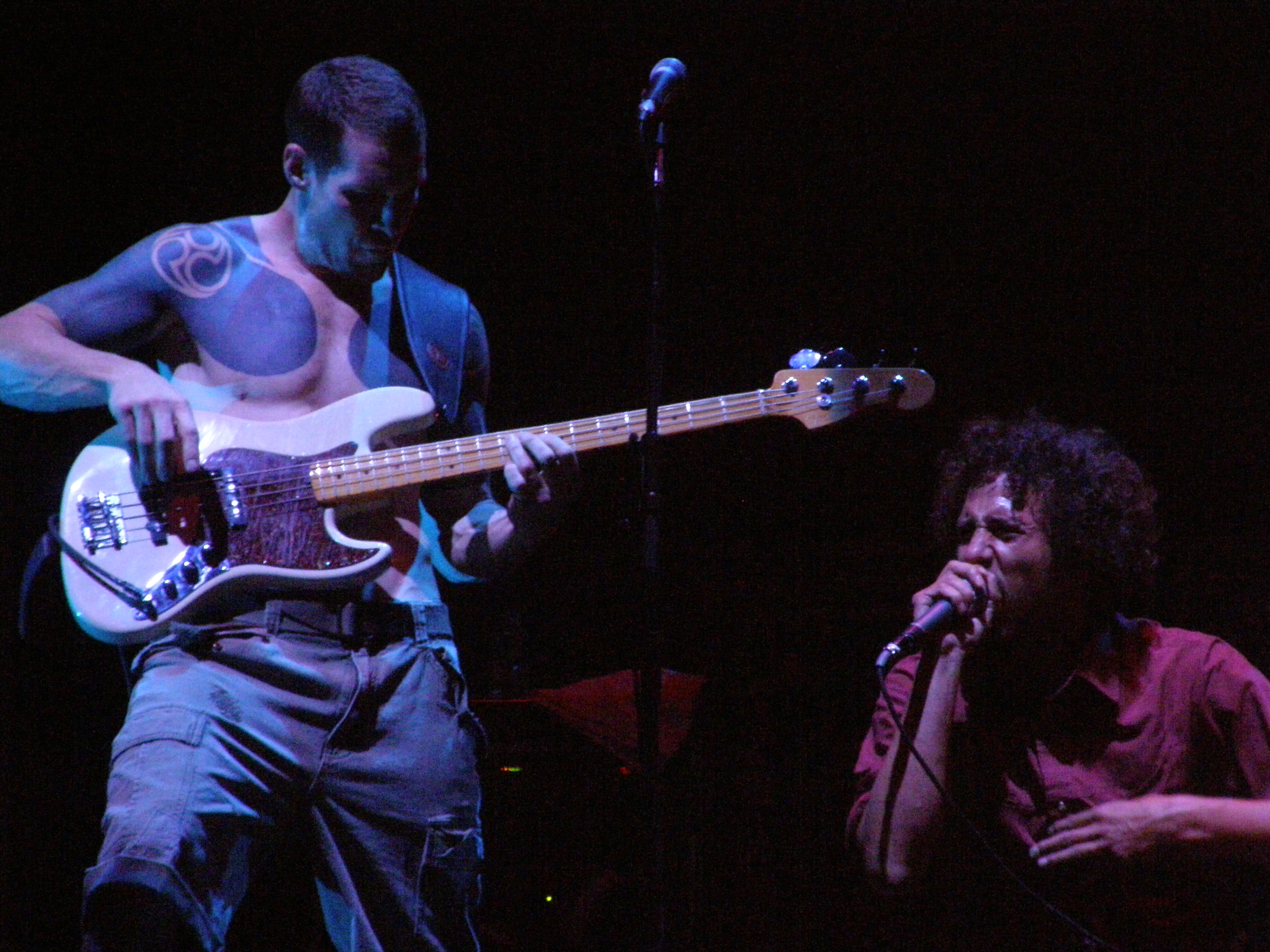
Rage Against the Machine performing in 2007

The funk metal bands formed in the San Francisco Bay Area were influenced by the earlier, punk-oriented Los Angeles bands such as the Red Hot Chili Peppers and Fishbone, and there would be interaction between bands from both cities. Red Hot Chili Peppers drummer Chad Smith recalled in 2014 that, "the Red Hot Chili Peppers used to play with Primus. I remember when we would come up to the Bay Area—especially in the late 80s, they were a really popular band up there. People would say 'Oh, Primus is like the Bay Area Chili Peppers. You've got to hear them!'". Smith added that, "obviously, they were doing their own thing [it] was quirky and people just loved them. You could tell they had a real loyal rabid fanbase—real fans that really dug what they were into." According to Steev Esquivel of the band Skinlab, the prevalence of funk metal around this time hurt the popularity of thrash metal music in the San Francisco Bay Area. He said Primus and Faith No More "came in and shut down the metal scene single handedly", and that bands such as these attracted a large female demographic that had previously followed thrash metal. John Joseph, who left crossover thrash band Cro-Mags to form funk metal band Both Worlds, told Spin in 1991 that, "funk is fun music to play, and it's good to see girls having a good time up front, not just dudes with spikes on their arms."

The New Jersey band Mind Funk signed to Epic Records in 1990 shortly after forming, with Spin describing their sound as mixing "metal's wall-of-sound guitar firepower and funk rhymes." At first, they were widely associated with the movement as a result of their name, although they have also since come to be associated with the grunge and stoner rock genres. Vocalist Pat Dubar distanced Mind Funk from the more funk-oriented bands in the movement, saying in 1991 that, "everyone's jumping on that bandwagon. We may have funky parts in our songs, but as far as playing straight funk, forget it. We couldn't do it as well as the guys who originated it. We take a lot of different elements from rap to the Doors and jazz and mix them together."

Los Angeles band Rage Against the Machine signed to Epic Records in 1991, the year that they formed, and achieved mainstream fame in the 1990s with their albums going multi-platinum. Infectious Grooves, another Los Angeles band, also signed to Epic Records at the beginning of the 1990s. Infectious Grooves included vocalist Mike Muir and bassist Robert Trujillo, both of Suicidal Tendencies, a hardcore/crossover thrash band. Suicidal Tendencies themselves had signed to Epic in the late 1980s and already begun adding funk metal elements to their music on 1990's Lights...Camera...Revolution!. The drummer for Infectious Grooves was Stephen Perkins of Jane's Addiction, a band from the same scene as the Red Hot Chili Peppers who occasionally delved into funk metal. Muir gave Infectious Grooves equal status as Suicidal Tendencies, and the two bands often toured together, necessitating an exhausting two sets per night for Muir and Trujillo. They released three albums through Epic in the 1990s, The Plague That Makes Your Booty Move... It's the Infectious Grooves (1991), Sarsippius' Ark (1993) and Groove Family Cyco (1994). Groove Family Cyco included a diss track towards Rage Against the Machine called "Do What I Tell Ya!". The feud with Rage Against the Machine originated after their guitarist Tom Morello began speaking negatively about Suicidal Tendencies in public, leading Muir to point out the irony of Morello's band preaching anti-corporate values in their lyrics while being signed to Epic Records.

Neg Raggett of AllMusic claims that by 1992 "oodles of (mostly horribly bad) funk-metal acts were following in Faith No More and the Red Hot Chili Peppers' footsteps." In an interview from around this time, Flea spoke negatively about derivative acts that were inspired by Faith No More and Red Hot Chili Peppers. After a writer compared Red Hot Chili Peppers to the new funk metal band Ugly Kid Joe, he said "I just know where their music is coming from – copping us, copping Faith No More, copping Pop-Rock Band No. 17B. We're coming from listening to Miles Davis, Ornette Coleman, Defunkt, Funkadelic, the Meters, James Brown – the real shit. And it's coming from jamming and playing billions of hours of shit that no one will hear."

Guitar virtuoso Buckethead began releasing albums through avant-garde labels in the early 1990s, and many of them have been associated with funk metal. Additionally, Buckethead was in the experimental band Praxis with veteran funk musician Bootsy Collins and former Limbomaniacs drummer Brain (who later joined Primus). Their music has also been associated with funk metal, particularly their 1992 debut Transmutation (Mutatis Mutandis).

=== Decline (mid–late 1990s) ===
By the latter part of the 1990s, funk metal was considered to be represented by a smaller group of bands, including Incubus, Sugar Ray, Jimmie's Chicken Shack and 311. Incubus formed in 1991 at the height of the genre's popularity, and they were inspired by funk metal bands. Vocalist Brandon Boyd has mentioned being a fan of Mr. Bungle's debut when it was first released, and has also said "Primus was one of those bands that myself, José from our band, Mikey from our band, the three of us fully bonded over them. We would just crank their music in the car, outdoors." Their 1997 major label debut album S.C.I.E.N.C.E. has been labelled a "weed-and-mushrooms influenced funk/metal freakout", unlike with the band's prior releases Fungus Amongus (1995) and Enjoy Incubus (1997), it further incorporated elements of electronica into funk metal. Guitarist Mike Einziger said in 1997 that the band had set out to record an album that sounded like "weird science and energetic funk." At the time, they garnered heavy comparisons to Faith No More, Red Hot Chili Peppers and Primus, with critics noting similarities between the voices of singer Brandon Boyd and Mike Patton. Some of the band's later releases still retained elements of funk, but they were viewed as being more musically straightforward than before. In November 2001, Amy Sciarretto of CMJ New Music Report claimed that Incubus was "poised to be hard rock's bastard child of Faith No More and Primus thanks to its resident hottie Brandon Boyd's easy-on-the-ears emulation of Mike Patton and Dirk Lance's bass thwapping. But between 1997's S.C.I.E.N.C.E. and 1999's Make Yourself, the album that broke Incubus at rock radio, the band took a stylistic turn." Hoobastank, a band from the same Southern Californian neighborhood as Incubus, were also heavily inspired by Mike Patton and Faith No More/Mr. Bungle. Their early independent releases Muffins (1997) and They Don't Sure Don't Make Basketball Shorts Like They Used To (1998) contain elements of ska and funk metal. After signing to Island Records in the early 2000s, the band changed to a more mainstream sound, garnering comparisons to the style of music that Incubus was making in the early 2000s.

Initially beginning as a hardcore punk band in the 1980s, Sugar Ray's first two major label releases Lemonade and Brownies (1995) and Floored (1997) have been frequently labelled as funk metal and punk-funk. Subsequent releases from Sugar Ray completely abandoned the sound of these albums in favor of a more mainstream approach, as they had gained massive popularity in 1997 with their pop/reggae single "Fly". Stephen Thomas Erlewine of AllMusic says that after the success of "Fly" they "no longer tried to ape the Red Hot Chili Peppers." In 1996, Australian band Regurgitator released a major label record in the country titled Tu-Plang, which has been associated with funk metal. The album would be given an American release the following year, although the band went on to explore other sounds.

Bands usually associated with other genres such as nu metal (Korn, Primer 55), pop-punk (Zebrahead) and comedy rock (Bloodhound Gang) also incorporated elements of funk metal into their sound during the late 1990s and early 2000s. Snot's first and only full-length release Get Some (1997) has been described by critics as not only a funk metal album, but also as a hardcore punk album and an early nu metal album. Korn, who are often credited with popularizing the nu metal sound on their 1994 debut, have named Faith No More and the Red Hot Chili Peppers as their two biggest musical influences. Korn has also cited 24-7 Spyz, Fishbone, Living Colour, Mr. Bungle, Primus and Rage Against the Machine as influences. AllMusic's Stephen Thomas Erlewine considers their debut to be "building on the funk-metal innovations of the late '80s/early '90s instead of merely replicating them." Some of the members of Korn were formerly in a funk metal band called L.A.P.D., who formed in 1989 and released their sole album Who's Laughing in 1992. Guitarist James 'Munky' Shaffer has still considered Korn to be funk metal, saying in 2014, "Korn began as, and has remained a funk-metal band." Their vocalist Jonathan Davis said in 2015, "I always thought of us as a funk band, that funky groovy shit. When they came out with that nu-metal shit, like, I’ve always been fighting that shit." The term nu metal was not yet in usage when albums such as Get Some were first released. Nu metal is generally considered to have entered the mainstream with Korn's 1998 album Follow the Leader, and the label was being used by the early 2000s. Critics have occasionally categorized Korn's work as funk metal, even after the nu metal label became prevalent. AllMusic described Korn's breakthrough 1997 single "A.D.I.D.A.S." as "a kinetic funk-metal track" in their retrospective review. While the more well-known work of Papa Roach has been described as nu metal, vocalist Jacoby Shaddix has noted that the band's independent releases from 1994 to 1997 had a more funk metal sound. He reflected, "if we go back and listen to the first P-Roach recordings, we sound like a cross between Mr. Bungle, Red Hot Chili Peppers and Primus. You know, that whole '90s scene that was funky and freaky - I even wore panty hose on my head." Mega!! Kung Fu Radio, the 1997 major label debut of Powerman 5000, showcased an aggressive form of funk metal, which the band themselves branded as "action-rock". All subsequent releases from Powerman 5000 moved towards an industrial metal/industrial rock sound. AllMusic suggests that funk metal was "played-out by the end of the decade".

After the release of Sailing the Seas of Cheese in 1991, Primus's subsequent albums started to delve into more experimental sounds, while still retaining a prominent funk influence. Les Claypool claimed that Primus's 1997 album Brown Album was a return to the aggressive sound of their earlier material, although critics labelled it as "flat-sounding" and as moving "even further into progressive and jazz-rock territory." Primus's next studio album Antipop (1999) was co-produced by Fred Durst of the band Limp Bizkit. Durst has cited Primus as a major influence, and he encouraged them to return to the aggressive sound of their earlier material. Mike Wolf of CMJ New Music Monthly called the album "ozzfest funk metal" in his 1999 review, and compared it not only to Limp Bizkit but also Korn. Later in 1999, Primus went on tour with Incubus, another artist who cite them as an influence. The band entered a hiatus the following year, and would not release another full-length album until 2011.

Other influential 1980s and early 1990s acts such as Faith No More, Mr. Bungle and Red Hot Chili Peppers had largely abandoned the sound in favor of other styles by the latter part of the 90s. Faith No More's bassist Billy Gould claimed he was "sick" of the genre as early as 1992, though the band's 1992 album Angel Dust has been described as having some funk metal characteristics. In 1995, he said: "we were perceived as a gimmick: a mixture of metal and funk and we had this pretty-boy singer. We found it really repulsive. We started getting tapes from bands who were heavy metal funk bands and they were saying we were their main influence, it was horrible. Angel Dust was a way for us to stretch our arms out and hold on to our identity, [Mike] Patton cut his hair and changed how he looked." Spin wrote in 1992 that Angel Dust had "slow, scary songs, and not as much funk-metal thrash as the average fan would expect." In 2003, Brad Filicky of CMJ New Music Report claimed that after the success of their previous album The Real Thing (1989), they "grew tired of the trappings and limitations of the genre [so] rather than release that era's equivalent of Significant Other, the band flipped the script entirely and dropped an experimental bombshell on the scene." Faith No More would eventually announce their initial split on April 20, 1998. The band's final two albums in the 1990s, King for a Day... Fool for a Lifetime (1995) and Album of the Year (1997), have usually been considered alternative metal albums rather than funk metal albums, although Rolling Stone still referred to Faith No More as a funk metal band when announcing their split in April 1998. Red Hot Chili Peppers' 1995 album One Hot Minute was still considered to have elements of their early funk metal/punk-funk sound, however, beginning with 1999's Californication, they began heading towards a more mainstream funk-influenced pop rock direction. According to The Washington Post in 1999, acts such as Korn and Limp Bizkit built on the "funk/metal/rap hybrid" of Red Hot Chili Peppers during the four year interval between One Hot Minute and Californication. Anthony Kiedis stated in 2002, "I don't think any of those conservative, ultra-aggro, rap metal bands had the funk influence or punk-rock energy that we had."

The feud between Kiedis and Patton was re-ignited in 1999 when Mr. Bungle's album California was pushed back by their label Warner Bros. Records as not to coincide with the similarly titled Californication, which was to be released on the same day by Warner Bros. Following the album release date conflict, Kiedis had Mr. Bungle removed from a number of European summer festivals that the Red Hot Chili Peppers were set to perform at. As a result of the concert removals, Mr. Bungle parodied the Red Hot Chili Peppers on Halloween 1999, in Pontiac, Michigan (the home state of Kiedis). Patton introduced each Mr. Bungle band member with the name of one of the Red Hot Chili Peppers, before covering the songs "Give It Away", "Around the World", "Under the Bridge" and "Scar Tissue", with Patton deliberately using incorrect lyrics, such as "Sometimes I feel like I'm on heroin" and "Sometimes I feel like a fucking junkie" on "Under the Bridge". Patton impersonated Kiedis by wearing a blonde wig, and while pretending to be Kiedis, mockingly said to the crowd: "Don't you call me Mike, my name is Anthony. How dare you make that mistake. Mike has been ripping me off for many years." His bandmates also mocked the heroin overdose death of former Red Hot Chili Peppers guitarist Hillel Slovak. Kiedis heard about the show and responded by having Mr. Bungle removed from the 2000 Big Day Out Festival in Australia. Regarding the concert removals, Mr. Bungle's guitarist Trey Spruance said, "It was pretty weird, having been fans of the first two RHCP albums, realizing that somehow something personal had gone amiss somewhere. So amiss that a decade and a half after we’d liked this now hugely popular band’s music (and hadn't thought much about since), we'd be dealing with the fact that they were unmistakably trying to bury us." Mr. Bungle ceased being active in late 2000. Some of their last shows were with Incubus in 2000 at the SnoCore Tour. By then, Mr. Bungle had stopped playing music from their first album, instead playing their avant-garde/experimental rock songs from Disco Volante (1995) and California. The only songs from their first album to be played during the California tour were "Travolta" (also known as "Quote Unquote") and "My Ass is on Fire", which was re-worked to have electronic elements. In late 2000, Rage Against the Machine also split.

=== Later years and legacy (2000s onward) ===
During 2001, Alien Ant Farm released a hugely successful funk metal cover of Michael Jackson's "Smooth Criminal", an electro funk song.

Bands formed in the 2000s and 2010s that have been described as funk metal include Psychostick, Twelve Foot Ninja and Prophets of Rage (a supergroup featuring members of Cypress Hill, Public Enemy and Rage Against the Machine).

In 2016, Vice referred to funk metal as "a mostly-forgotten and occasionally-maligned genre". Trey Spruance mentioned his fondness for the genre in a 2007 interview. When asked if he thought it would make a comeback, he stated "Fuckin' revisionists probably won't think its cool enough... they'll go straight for the flannels and heroin." In 2022, Blabbermouth.net labelled the genre as "absurdly entertaining and considerably more inventive than many of the cross-pollinated subgenres that came later", further adding that "obviously, funk-metal was not built to last and both grunge and nu-metal were far bigger commercial propositions in the years that followed."

Fox News host Greg Gutfeld injected himself into the Kiedis-Patton feud in 2016, calling Red Hot Chili Peppers "the worst band in the universe" and "poor man's Faith No More." In 2020, Mr. Bungle reunited as a thrash metal band, with the band's earlier funk metal material not being performed live. German band Slope's 2024 album Freak Dreams, released on Century Media, was widely described as funk metal upon release.

== See also ==
- Groove metal
- Rap metal
- List of funk metal and funk rock bands
